= Emigration during the Hugo Chávez administration =

Emigration during the Hugo Chávez administration involved many Venezuelans, primarily upper-class and educated professionals, leaving Venezuela to live in other countries. This trend would increase throughout Chávez's tenure, later culminating in the Venezuelan refugee crisis. From the beginning to the end of Chávez tenure, it was estimated by the Central University of Venezuela (UCV) that 1.5 million Venezuelans (four to six percent of the country's total population) had emigrated.

== History ==
=== Election of Chávez ===
In 1998, when Chávez was first elected, 14 Venezuelans were granted asylum in the United States; according to U.S. Citizenship and Immigration Services, 1,086 Venezuelans were granted asylum in the 12-month period ending in September 1999. Chávez's detractors said that they were concerned with his "history of violence" – leading a failed military coup d'état attempt. His promises to allocate more funds to the impoverished also concerned wealthy and middle-class Venezuelans, triggering the first wave of emigrants fleeing the Bolivarian government.

=== 2002 coup d'état attempt ===
After the coup d'état attempt in April 2002 and years of political tension following Chávez's rise to power, Venezuela experienced a spike in emigration. A May 2002 cable from the United States embassy in Caracas to United States agencies expressed astonishment at the number of Venezuelans attempting to enter the United States. By June of that year, many Venezuelans with family or links to other countries had emigrated; others, who had immigrated to Venezuela, began to leave due to economic and political instability.

=== Re-election of Chávez ===
Following the 2006 presidential elections and Chávez's re-election, visits to emigration websites by Venezuelans increased; visits to MeQuieroIr.com (Spanish: I want to leave) rose from 20,000 in December 2006 to 30,000 in January 2007, and there was a 700 percent increase in visa applications from Venezuelans at vivaenaustralia.com.

== Causes ==
Chávez's promise to allocate more funds to the impoverished concerned wealthy and middle-class Venezuelans, triggering the first wave of emigrants fleeing the Bolivarian government. Later in his tenure, Chávez would seize private property and target political opponents, sparking increased uneasiness and ultimately emigration. Andrés Bello Catholic University Economic and Social Research Institute head Anitza Freitez stated that during the Chávez presidency, "individual development prospects and individual security" were the main causes of emigration from Venezuela.

== Deterrents ==
Venezuelans also chose not to emigrate during the Chávez administration; an increased emigration rate was prevented due to deterrents. Though Venezuelans faced increased unrest later in Chávez's tenure, they were also prevented from leaving the country due to economic issues such as the Great Recession and because they lacked destination locations. According to professor Manuel Gómez of Florida International University, Venezuelans at the time "weren't willing to sacrifice their social and professional status for a lesser life", though this would change as the crisis in Venezuela intensified.

== Effects ==
The United States embassy in Caracas stated in May 2002 that the "drain of skilled workers could have a significant impact on Venezuela's future". This sentiment would also be shared later by Newsweek, with the magazine stating in 2009 that "the outrush of Venezuelan brainpower is gutting universities and thinktanks, crippling industries and hastening the economic disarray that threatens to destroy one of the richest countries in the hemisphere" and that "the biggest export of the Bolivarian revolution is talent". By 2009, 9,000 Venezuelan scientists resided in the United States while 6,000 lived in Venezuela and it was estimated that more than one million Venezuelans had emigrated in the ten years that Chávez was president. According to the Central University of Venezuela (UCV), an estimated 1.5 million Venezuelans emigrated between 1999 and 2014.

== Destinations ==
Many of the wealthy Venezuelans emigrated to the United States, mainly choosing to reside in Miami, Doral and Weston, Florida, while others decided to settle in Panama City. Venezuelan oil professionals utilized their trade to work in Canadian oil industries.
