= Venezuelan refugee crisis =

Emigration of millions of Venezuelans during the Bolivarian Revolution

- Part of Crisis in Venezuela
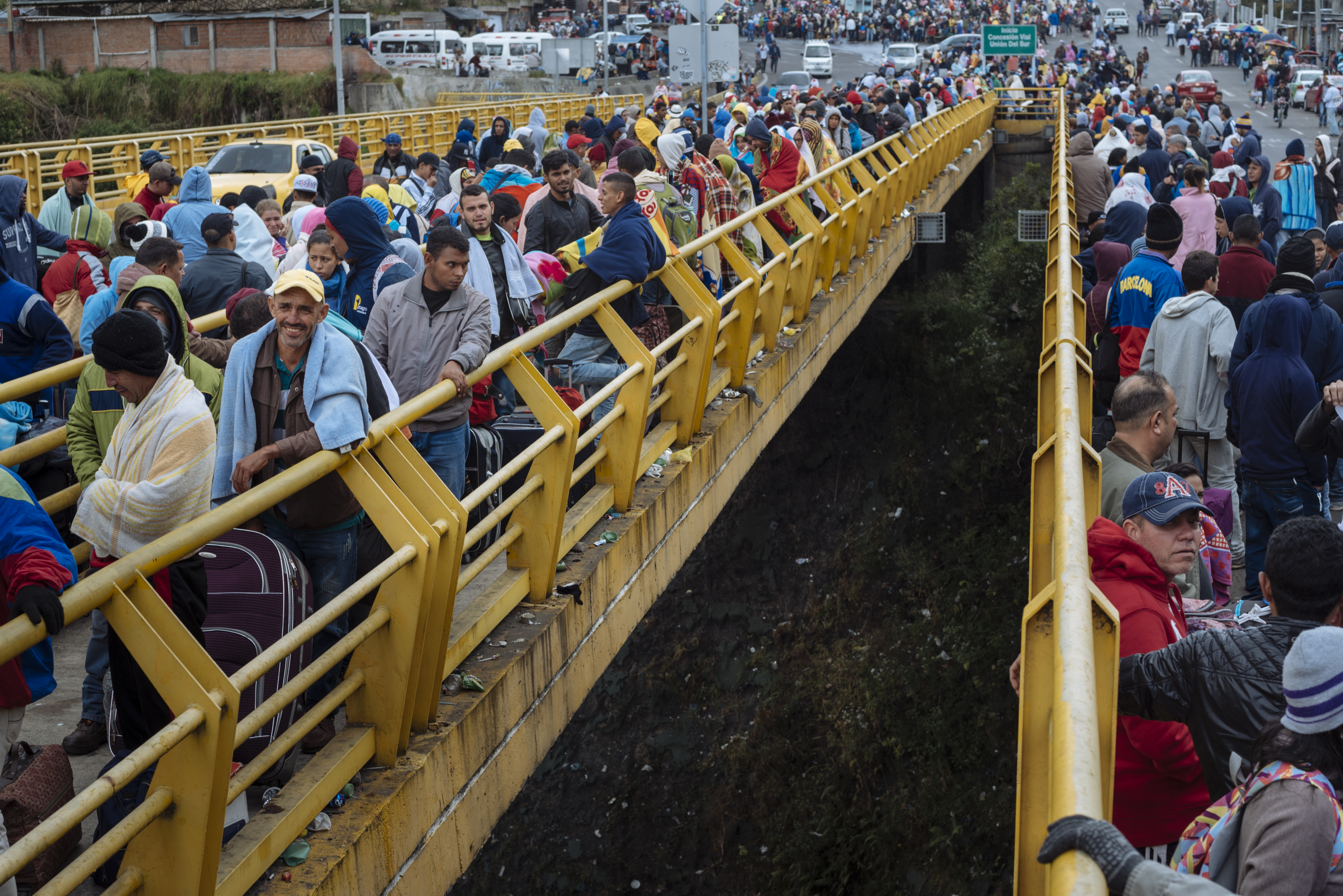
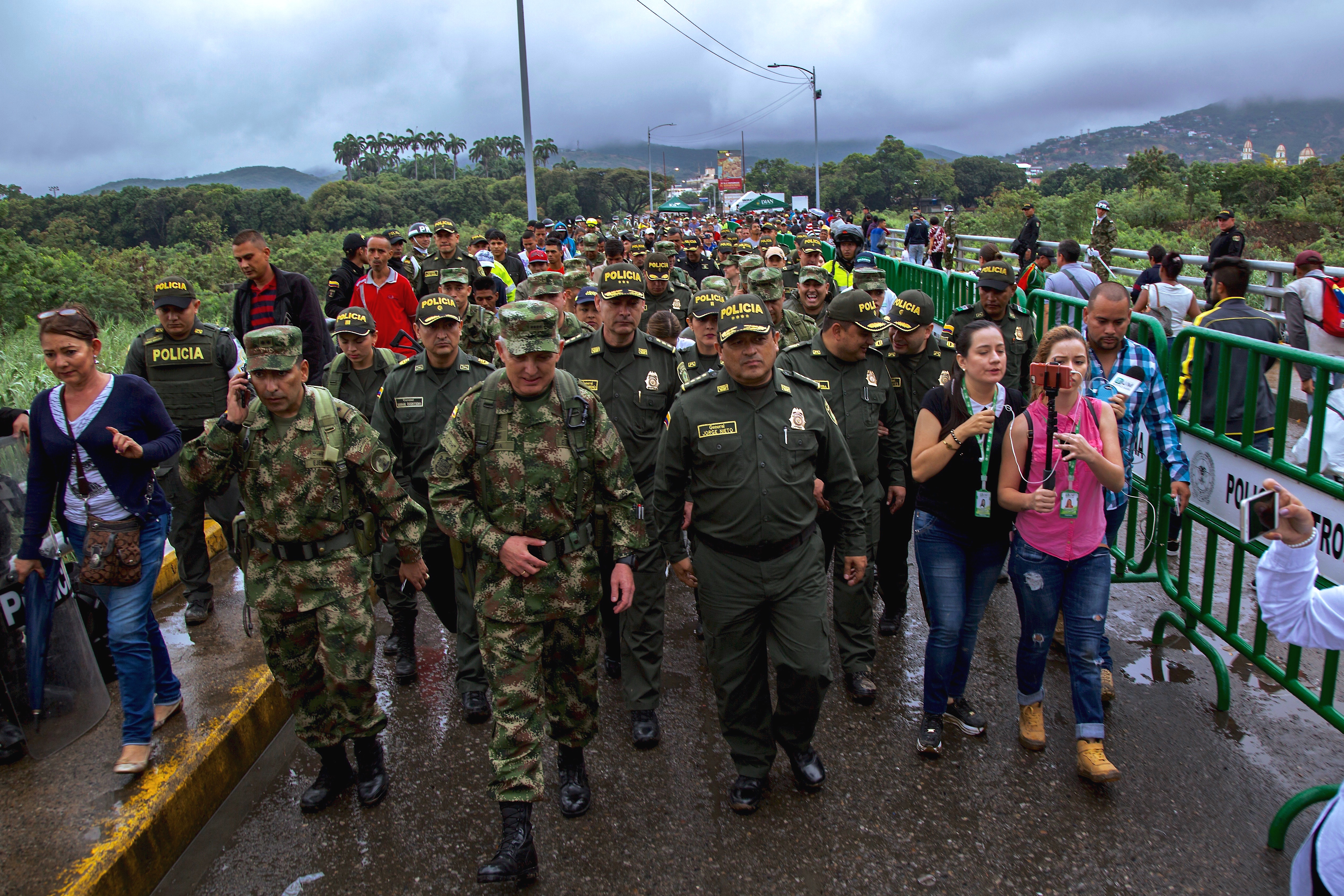
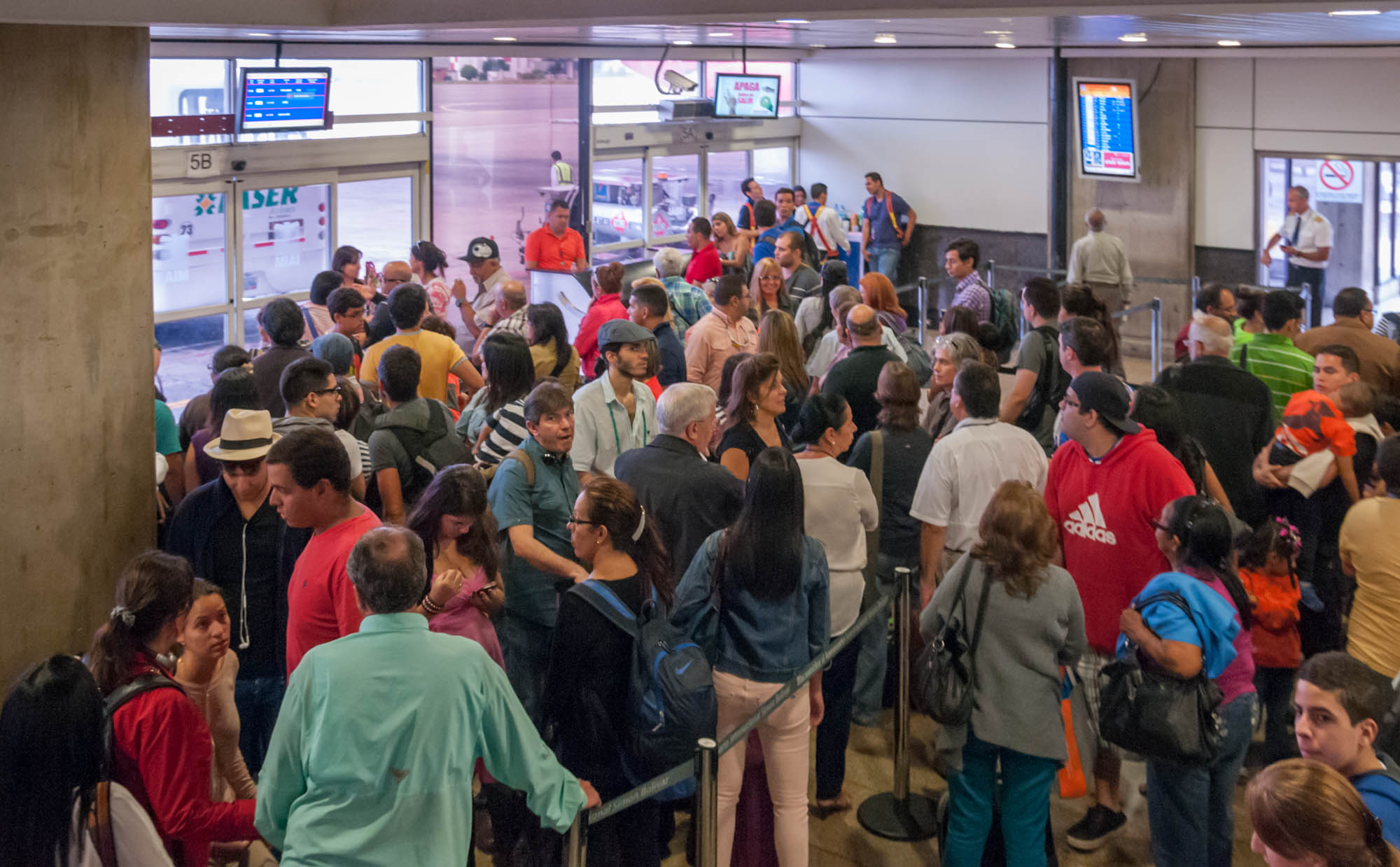
- Top to bottom, left to right: Hundreds of Venezuelans waiting to stamp their passports in an Ecuadorian customs house; Colombian National Police leading Venezuelans into Cúcuta, Colombia; Airline passengers leaving Venezuela from Maiquetia Airport
- Date: 2015–present
- Location: Venezuela
- Also known as: Bolivarian diaspora Venezuelan exodus
- Cause: Social issues, political repression, crime, economic downturn, corruption, poverty, censorship, unemployment, hyperinflation, shortages, undernutrition, human rights violations and others
- Outcome: More than 7.9 million Venezuelans have emigrated; Refugee crisis in countries neighboring Venezuela; Human capital flight; Several countries impose visa requirements and entry restrictions on Venezuelans; The United States, Canada, Spain and several Latin American countries start accepting expired Venezuelan passports for entering the country; The Colombian government announces that babies born to Venezuelan refugees will be granted citizenship

The ongoing emigration of millions of Venezuelans from their native country is the largest recorded refugee crisis in the Americas. The refugee crisis followed the Bolivarian Revolution, an attempt by the successive presidents Hugo Chávez and Nicolás Maduro to establish a cultural and political hegemony, which culminated in the crisis in Venezuela. The resulting refugee crisis has been compared to those faced by Cuban exiles, Syrian refugees and those affected by the European migrant crisis. The Bolivarian government has denied any migratory crisis, stating that the United Nations and others are attempting to justify foreign intervention within Venezuela.

Newsweek described the "Bolivarian diaspora" as "a reversal of fortune on a massive scale", where the reversal refers to Venezuela's high immigration rate during the 20th century. Initially, upper class Venezuelans and scholars emigrated during Chávez's presidency, but middle- and lower-class Venezuelans began to leave as conditions worsened in the country. This has caused a brain drain that affects the nation, due to the large number of emigrants who are educated or skilled. According to one survey, a sharp increase in the number of Venezuelans wishing to emigrate was observed between December 2015 (30%) and September 2016 (57%). By mid-2019, over four million Venezuelans had emigrated since the revolution began in 1999, the vast majority in just the preceding three-and-a-half years. (Note: According to the UN, 700,000 had fled by the end of 2015.)

Estimates had risen to 7.1 million by October 2022, over 20 percent of the country's population, exceeding the refugees from the Syrian civil war to become the most voluminous such crisis in history. The Norwegian Refugee Council, the Brookings Institution and the Organization of American States commissioner for the Venezuelan refugee crisis, David Smolansky, have estimated that the crisis is also one of the most underfunded refugee crises in modern history.

According to the UNHCR, more than 7.9 million people have emigrated from Venezuela in the years corresponding to Maduro's rise to power and the consolidation of Chavismo. From May to August 2023, 390,000 Venezuelans left their country, driven by despair over challenging living conditions, characterized by low wages, rampant inflation, lack of public services, and political repression. However, R4V suggests that these figures could be even higher, as many migrants without regular status are not included in the count. The organization's calculation method is based on asylum requests and refugee registrations in each country, which might exclude those in irregular situations.

== History ==
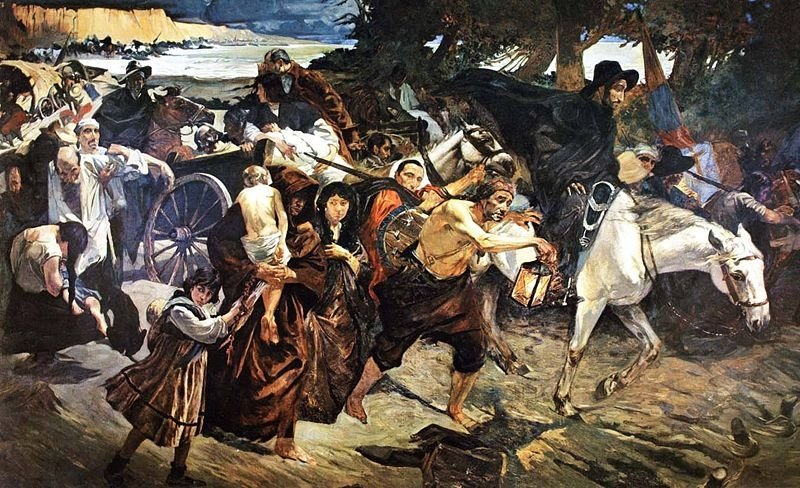
The emigration to the east, oil painting by Tito Salas.

The 1814 Caracas Exodus occurred during the Venezuelan War of Independence, when thousands of civilians fled from the capital Caracas towards the east of the country, after the defeat of Venezuelan patriots in the Second Battle of La Puerta on 15 June 1814.

News about the approach of José Tomás Boves and his royalists troops caused panic amongst the population in Caracas, so on 7 July 1814, more than 20,000 people emigrated to the East of the country, along with Simon Bolívar and his remaining Patriot troops. Many thousands perished. Although a large number of people followed Bolívar on the long journey, another group, especially the most politically committed, sought refuge in the Antilles or New Granada, while a third group gave up the march and returned to Caracas to place themselves under the protection of Archbishop Coll y Prat.

In December 1820, the Numancia battalion, a Spanish Regiment formed in Venezuela by Pablo Morillo in Venezuela and sent to reinforce the Viceroyalty of Peru, joined the Patriot governments during the Spanish American wars of independence by crossing the Huaura River. Once the army was formally incorporated in Huaura to San Martin Army, it changed its name to Voltigeros de la Guardia and went on to fight in the Peruvian War of Independence.

Following the victory of the patriot forces at the Battle of Carabobo on September 18, 1821, the Gran Colombian President Simón Bolívar approved a law under which "all Spaniards under the age of 80, whether from the Iberian Peninsula or the Canary islands, who could not prove they had participated in the independence movement would be forcibly expelled from the country."

In Puerto Cabello, approximately 2,000 Spanish civilians sought refuge in the San Felipe Fortress. Bolívar ordered a siege by land and sea to prevent a royalist counteroffensive in Venezuela. Admiral Laborde participated in the evacuation of the first Spanish civilians from the port of La Guaira to Havana.

The garrison of Puerto Cabello withstood the siege until November 1823. That place was the last refuge of a territory that had been Spanish since the time of Christopher Columbus. The surrender of the San Felipe fortress ended with only 400 surviving soldiers. The main destination for those expelled was the Spanish Caribbean islands, especially Cuba and Puerto Rico, where 3,555 refugees arrived.

Between 1823 and 1830, prominent Venezuelans military and political figures served as presidents of various countries in the Andean region and died out the country. General Simón Bolívar held supreme command—either simultaneously or consecutively—over Colombia, Peru and Bolivia. Antonio José de Sucre was the first constitutional president of Bolivia, governing formally from December 1825 to August 1828. Following the dissolution of Gran Colombia, General Juan José Flores became the founder and first president of the Republic of Ecuador, serving his first constitutional term from 1830 to 1834. Rafael Urdaneta was the last president of Gran Colombia.

Since 1830 several presidents were forced into exile after being overthrown: in 1835, José María Vargas—Venezuela's first civilian president—was arrested and exiled alongside Vice President Andrés Narvarte during the Revolution of the Reforms, though both were reinstated within weeks. In 1855, anti-Jewish riots in Coro forced the city's entire Jewish community of 168 people to flee to Curaçao. In 1858, following the triumph of the March Revolution, José Tadeo Monagas went into exile under the terms of the Urrutia Protocol; and in 1892, Raimundo Andueza Palacio left the country after the victory of the Legalist Revolution, led by Joaquín Crespo. Many instances of exile occurred following Julián Castro's order to expel figures from the Liberal Party, as well as after the triumph of the Legalist Revolution. Common destinations for exiles included Colombia, Caribbean islands (Curazao, Saint Thomas and Trinidad), USA and sometimes Europe. In some cases, exiled Venezuelans planned military incursions or uprisings against the government then in power.

During the 20th century, a significant number of exiles occurred under the dictatorships of Cipriano Castro, Juan Vicente Gómez and Marcos Pérez Jiménez. Following Juan Vicente Gómez's death in 1935, Eleazar López Contreras allowed exiles to return to the country, although on March 13, 1937, he decreed the expulsion of 47 political leaders accused of communism. The trend of presidents and public officials going into exile—often due to coups d'état—continued into the 20th century: Cipriano Castro remained in exile after the 1908 coup, having left the country for medical reasons; Isaías Medina Angarita was forced to leave after the 1945 coup; Rómulo Gallegos went into exile following the 1948 coup; and Marcos Pérez Jiménez did so in the wake of the 1958 coup.

Since 1945, "Venezuela was a haven for immigrants fleeing Europe post war and Latin American dictatorships repression and intolerance" according to Newsweek. Emigration began at low rates in 1983 after oil prices collapsed, though the increased rates of emigration, especially the flight of professionals, grew largely following the Bolivarian Revolution which was led by Venezuelan president Hugo Chávez. Andrés Bello Catholic University Economic and Social Research Institute head Anitza Freitez said that emigration became more prominent during Chávez's presidency, attributing "individual development prospects and individual security" as the main reasons.

=== Initial emigration ===
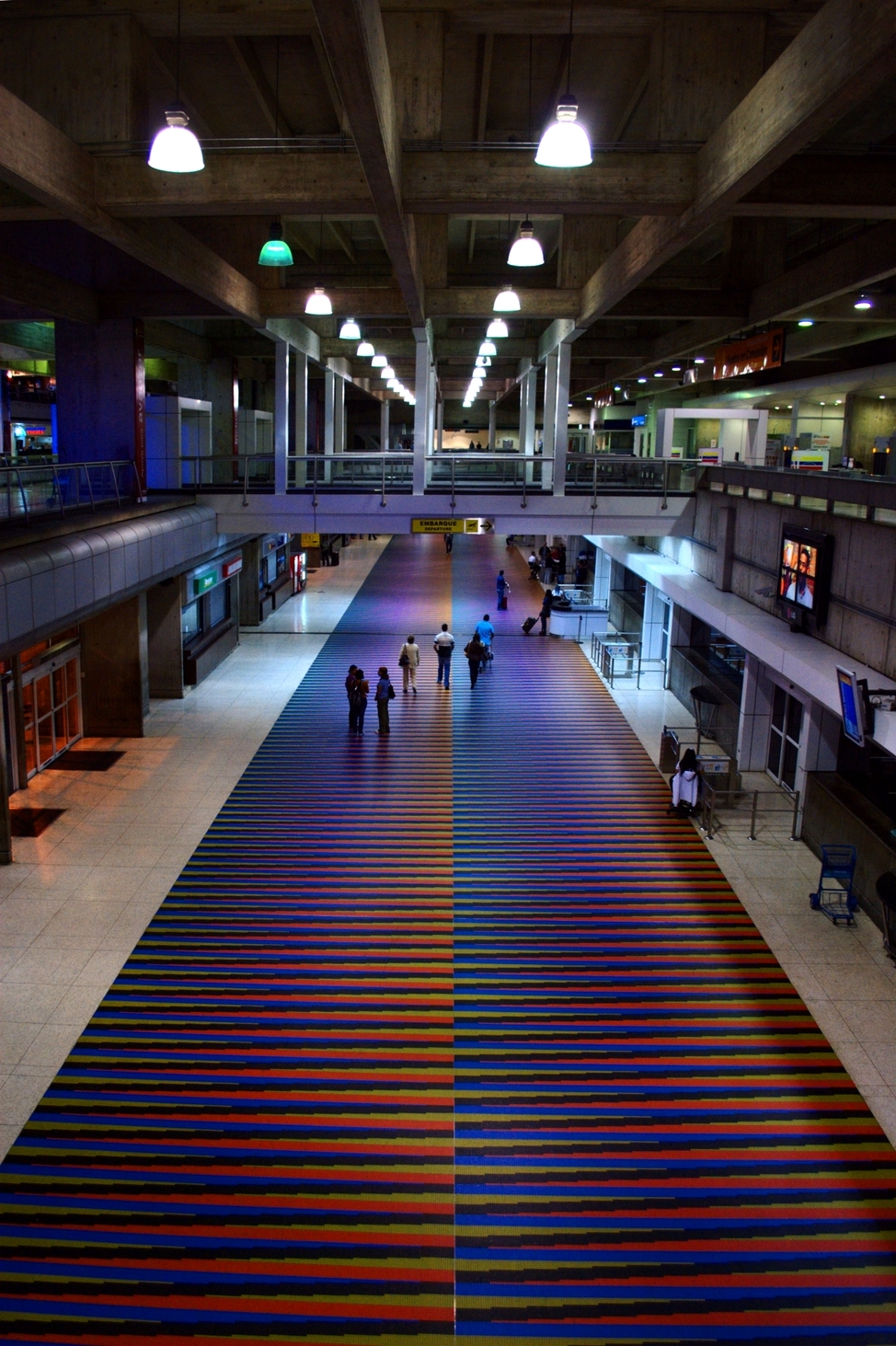
Venezuelan emigrants often take selfies of their feet against the Carlos Cruz-Diez-designed tiles at Maiquetia International Airport. The Bolivarian government installed a replica of the tiles at the airport with the phrase Take a Selfie written in front of it, which was seen as mocking the emigrants.

In 1998, when Chávez was first elected, the number of Venezuelans granted asylum in the United States increased between 1998 and 1999. Chávez's promise to allocate more funds to the impoverished caused concern among wealthy and middle-class Venezuelans, triggering the first wave of emigrants fleeing the Bolivarian government.

Additional waves of emigration occurred following the 2002 Venezuelan coup d'état attempt and after Chávez's re-election in 2006. In 2009, it was estimated that more than one million Venezuelans had emigrated in the ten years since Hugo Chávez became president. According to the Central University of Venezuela (UCV), an estimated 1.5 million Venezuelans (four to six percent of the country's total population) emigrated between 1999 and 2014.

=== Crisis in Venezuela ===
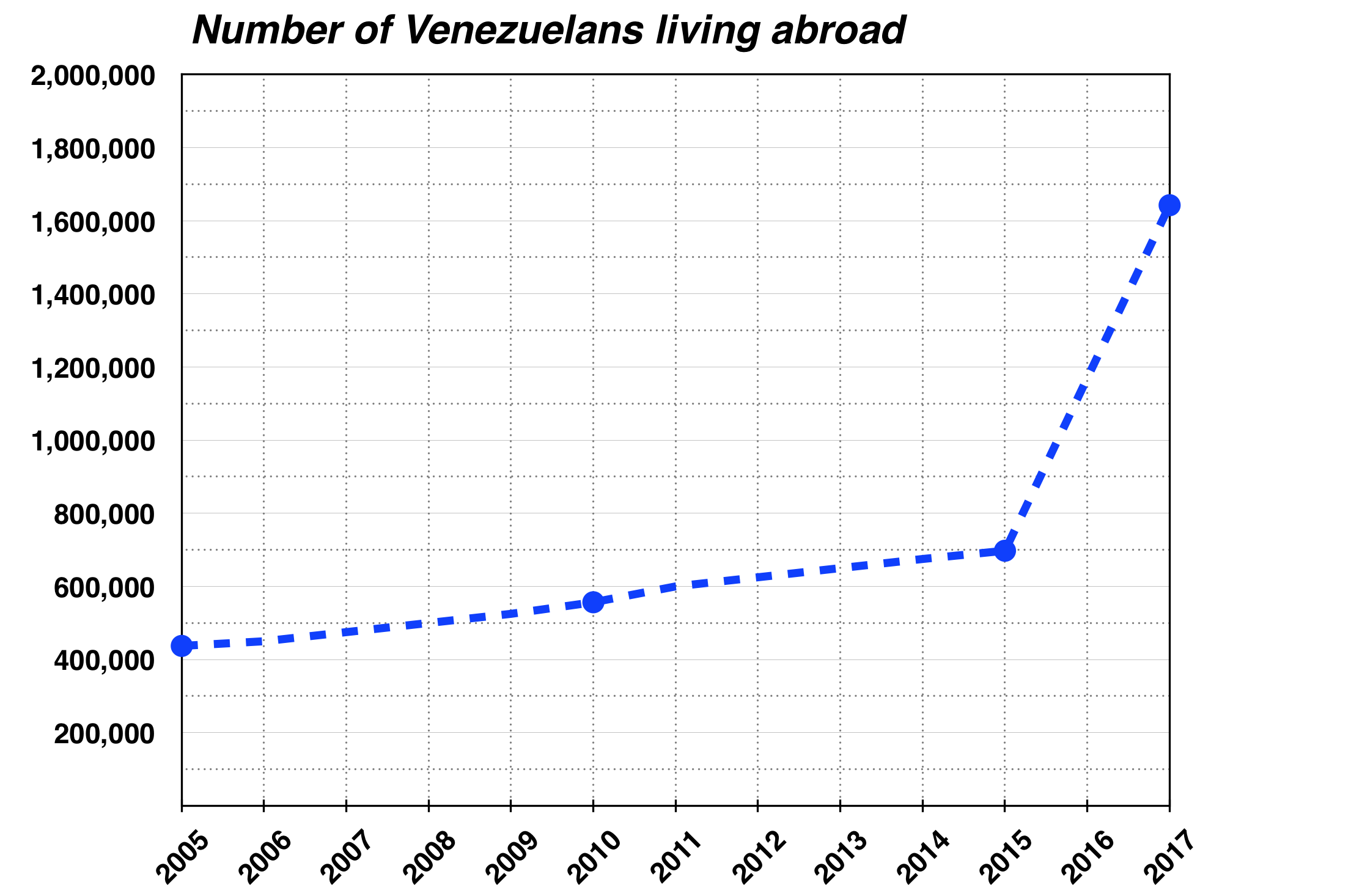
Source: International Organization for Migration

Academics and business leaders have said that emigration from Venezuela increased significantly during the final years of Chávez's presidency and during the presidency of Nicolás Maduro. Over time, emigration increased dramatically during the crisis and began to include lower-income Venezuelans, the people whom Chávez promised to aid and who were experiencing hunger in the country's economic crisis. Venezuelan men initially left their wives, children and elderly relatives behind as they fled the country to find work in order to send money back home, sometimes risking their lives walking the Darien Gap. Mothers and children would later leave Venezuela to find their families as they grew exacerbated with the crisis as remittances could not sustain their daily needs.

==== Election of Maduro and 2014 protests ====
After the election of Maduro in 2013 and as protests intensified in 2014, the emigration rate from Venezuela grew. The Associated Press reported that the Venezuelan middle-class began to emigrate at this time as the crisis intensified with more shortages, inflation and unrest.

Between 2012 and 2015, the number of Venezuelans who emigrated increased by 2,889 percent. In 2015, PGA Group estimated that a total of about 1.8 million Venezuelans had emigrated. The following year, an estimated 150,000-plus Venezuelans emigrated; scholars studying the diaspora, which The New York Times referred to as an "exodus", reportedly said that this was "the highest [number] in more than a decade".

==== 2017 constitutional crisis and Constituent Assembly elections ====
During the 2017 constitutional crisis, Colombia prepared for an increase of Venezuelan refugees. According to the Colombian government, more than 100,000 Venezuelans emigrated to Colombia in the first half of 2017. In the run-up to the 2017 Constituent Assembly elections, Colombia granted a Special Permit of Permanent Residence to Venezuelan citizens who entered the country before July 25; over 22,000 Venezuelans applied for permanent residency in Colombia in the program's first 24 hours. The United Nations High Commissioner for Refugees found that host countries throughout Latin America recorded more than one million Venezuelans settling between 2014 and 2017. The intergovernmental International Organization for Migration (IOM) had similar figures, with about one million Venezuelans emigrating between 2015 and 2017 in their data; other statistics indicated that the IOM's numbers may have been conservative.

==== 2018 re-election of Maduro ====
After President Maduro's controversial re-election in May 2018, emigration continued; Venezuelans believed that Maduro's policies would not change, and conditions in the country would continue to deteriorate. In September 2018, the United Nations High Commissioner for Refugees' regional representative officially compared the crisis with the migrant and refugee crisis caused by the Syrian Civil War. The UNHCR and IOM released data in November 2018 showing that the number of refugees fleeing Venezuela since the Bolivarian revolution began in 1999 had risen to 3 million, around 10 percent of the country's population.

==== 2019 presidential crisis ====
Into 2019, president of the National Assembly Juan Guaidó was declared acting president of Venezuela, beginning a presidential crisis. On April 30, 2019, Guaidó attempted to lead a military uprising to remove Maduro from power, with the plan ultimately failing. Emigration increased once more as Venezuelans predicted that they would not see significant changes and due to the blunders by the opposition. As prospects of political change diminished in Venezuela, a July 2019 poll by Venezuelan-pollster Consultares 21 estimated that between 4.7 and 6 million Venezuelans had left the country. By this point, the Venezuelan refugee crisis was considered the second-worst in the world, behind that from the Syrian Civil War. At the end of 2019, Maduro had firmly established himself in power and opposition to him had become discouraged, resulting with critics leaving the country.

==== 2024 political crisis ====
Following the announcement of results of the July 28, 2024, Venezuelan presidential election, a national and international political crisis developed. Concerns about another refugee crisis have emerged since the election; millions of people who expected change from the election are likely to flee to countries that are already strained from accepting large numbers of Venezuelan immigrants. Such a large migration would exacerbate the border crisis in the US and have a "devastating effect" on other countries in Latin America.

Following on the repression and crackdown on dissent by the Maduro administration, a Meganálisis poll of 1,007 people from August 8 to 11 indicated that over 40% of Venezuelans intend to leave the country soon. Meganálisis's results show that 600,000 Venezuelans intend to emigrate by mid-September, and another 930,000 hope to emigrate by December, joining the already 7.7 million in the Venezuelan diaspora.

== Causes ==
Parents will say, "I would rather say goodbye to my son in the airport than in the cemetery".

— Tomás Páez, Central University of Venezuela

El Universal reported that according to the UCV study Venezuelan Community Abroad: A New Method of Exile, by Tomás Páez, Mercedes Vivas and Juan Rafael Pulido, the Bolivarian diaspora has been caused by the "deterioration of both the economy and the social fabric, rampant crime, uncertainty and lack of hope for a change of leadership in the near future". The Wall Street Journal said that many "white-collar Venezuelans have fled the country's high crime rates, soaring inflation and expanding statist controls". Studies of current and former citizens of Venezuela indicated that reasons for leaving the country included lack of freedom, high levels of insecurity and lack of opportunity. Link Consultants director Óscar Hernández said that causes for emigration include economic issues, although insecurity and legal uncertainties are the main reasons.

=== Crime and insecurity ===
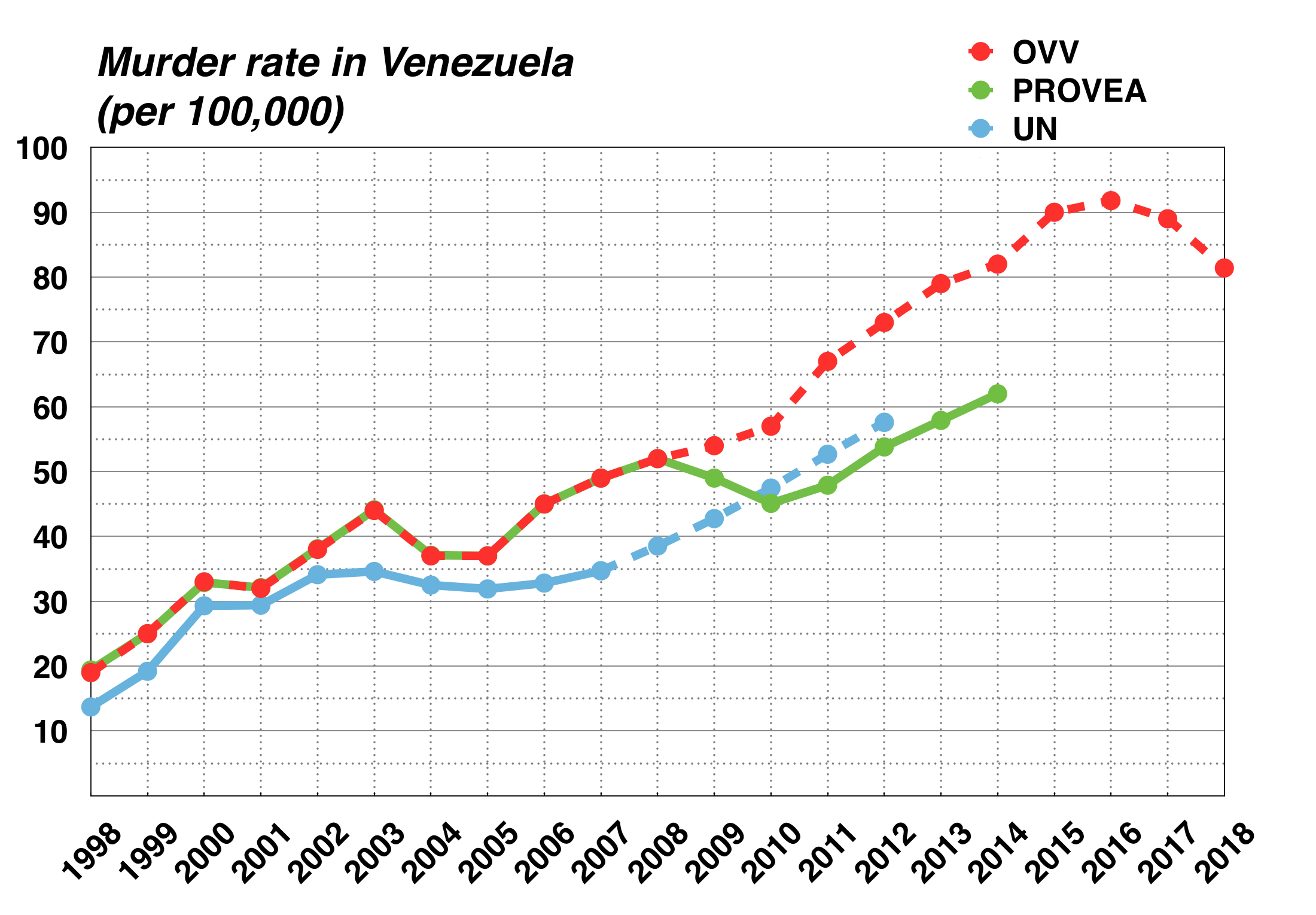
Murder rate from 1998 to 2018. Sources: OVV, PROVEA, UN * UN dashed line is projected from missing data.

Venezuela's crime rate is a major cause of emigration. According to sociologist Tomás Páez, Venezuelan parents and grandparents encourage young people to leave the country for their own safety.

Venezuela deteriorated under Hugo Chávez, with political instability and violence increasing. According to Gareth A. Jones and Dennis Rodgers in their book, Youth Violence in Latin America: Gangs and Juvenile Justice in Perspective, the change of regime that came with Chávez's presidency caused political conflict, which was "marked by a further increase in the number and rate of violent deaths". Roberto Briceño-León agrees, writing that the Bolivarian Revolution attempted to "destroy what previously existed, the status quo of society", with instability increasing as a result; he also believes that the government furthered these social issues by attributing violence and crime to poverty and inequality, and boasting about reducing both as the Venezuelan murder rate increased. The increase in the murder rate following the Chávez presidency has been attributed by experts to the corruption of Venezuelan authorities, poor gun control, and a poor judicial system. The murder rate increased from 25 per 100,000 in 1999 (when Chávez was elected) to 82 per 100,000 in 2014.

In 2018, there were an estimated 81.4 deaths per 100,000 people, which makes this the highest rate in Latin America. Based on WHO standards, this makes violence an epidemic in 88% of the municipalities. There are also estimates that claim Venezuela has the highest rates of kidnapping in the region and claims that kidnappings increased over twenty-fold from the beginning of the Chávez presidency to 2011. There has also been a rise in extrajudicial executions in which the government force called Special Action Forces (FAES) carried out executions under the guise of security operations. More than 7,500 of the 23,000 violent deaths reported in 2018 were caused by resistance to authority. Between January and May 2019 there were 2,100 of such deaths reported.

The murder rate in Venezuela had also decreased significantly between 2017 and 2020. In 2018, Venezuela's murder rate–described as the highest in the world–had begun to decrease to 81.4 per 100,000 people according to the Venezuelan Violence Observatory (OVV), with the organization stating that this downward trend was due to the millions of Venezuelans that emigrated from the country at the time. The murder rate declined even further to 60.3 in 2019.

=== Economy ===
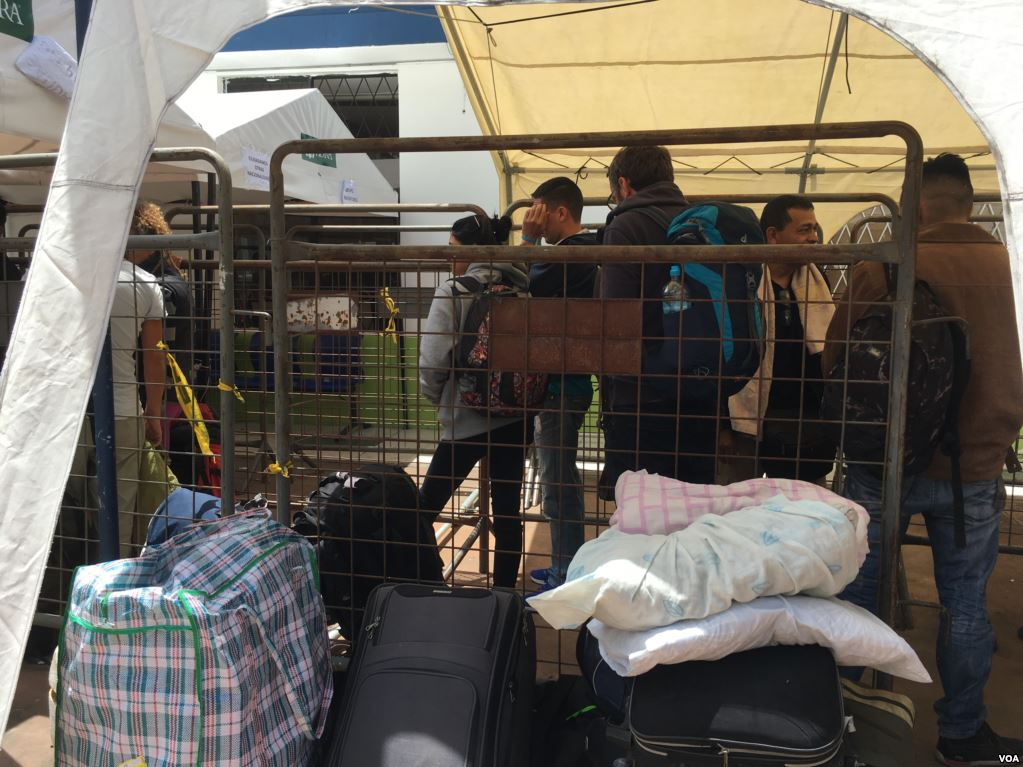
Venezuelan migrants being processed in Ecuador (2018)

A large push factor for the mass emigration from Venezuela continues to be the deteriorating economic situation of the country. The Venezuelan economic crisis, which is known as one of the most severe in recent economic history, was largely driven by the international oil prices dropping in 2014 and the governments inadequate response led to the exacerbation of the crisis and eventual 2017 recession, which is one of the worst recessions in the recent history of the Western hemisphere.

Many business owners have emigrated to countries with growing economies since the Bolivarian Revolution. The economic crisis experienced in Venezuela is worse than the events following the dissolution of the Soviet Union. Since Hugo Chávez imposed stringent currency controls in 2003 in an attempt to prevent capital flight, a series of currency devaluations has disrupted the Venezuelan economy. Price controls and other government policies have caused severe shortages in Venezuela. As a result of the shortages, Venezuelans must search for food (occasionally eating wild fruit or garbage), wait in line for hours, and live without some products.

According to a 2018 Gallup analysis, "[g]overnment decisions have led to a domino-effect crisis that continues to worsen, leaving residents unable to afford basic necessities such as food and housing", with Venezuelans "believ[ing] they can find better lives elsewhere".

Currently, the economy of Venezuela continues to experience stagflation, devaluation, a housing crisis, exacerbated external debt, and reductions of more than 35% reduction in GDP. According to the International Monetary Fund (IMF), the Venezuelan economy contracted by 45% between 2013 and 2018. Venezuela's inflation rate passed over 100 percent by 2015, the world's highest inflation rate and the highest in the country's history. By the end of 2018, this rate would rise to 1.35 million percent. Although annual inflation rates remain high, it has slowed since 2018 and inflation remained at 190 percent in 2023.

==== Health and healthcare access ====
The economic and political situation in Venezuela led to increasing levels of poverty and scarcity of resources including food and medicine, greatly impacting the health and well-being of Venezuelans. In 2018, it was estimated that about 90% of the population was living in conditions of poverty. With regards to nutritional health, in 2017 Venezuelans lost an average of 11 kilograms of bodyweight and 60% of the population reported that they did not have sufficient resources necessary to access food. Venezuelans remaining in country have little access to food items, in 2018 the Ministry of Food reported that 84% of items that are part of the basic food basket as are not available in supermarkets. Food production has also decreased by 60% between 2014 and 2018, the agricultural sectors has been weakened by both the Chavez and Maduro administrations, and food imports decreased by 70% between 2014 and 2016.

Additionally, the general fracturing of the state led to reduced provision of health services and a deteriorating health sector. This low resource impoverished setting was the perfect breeding ground for the rise of diseases such as measles, diphtheria, tuberculosis, and malaria. Medicine imports decreased by 70% between the years 2012 and 2016, only 15 out of 56 pharmaceutical companies still function, and over 150 pharmacies have closed since 2016. In late 2018, 85% of essential medicines were declared as being scarce, and according to the UN, 300,000 individuals are at risk because they have not had access to essential medicines for over a year. The Government has stopped publishing data on national level health indicators in 2015, but the situation is believed to be dire.

=== Political repression ===
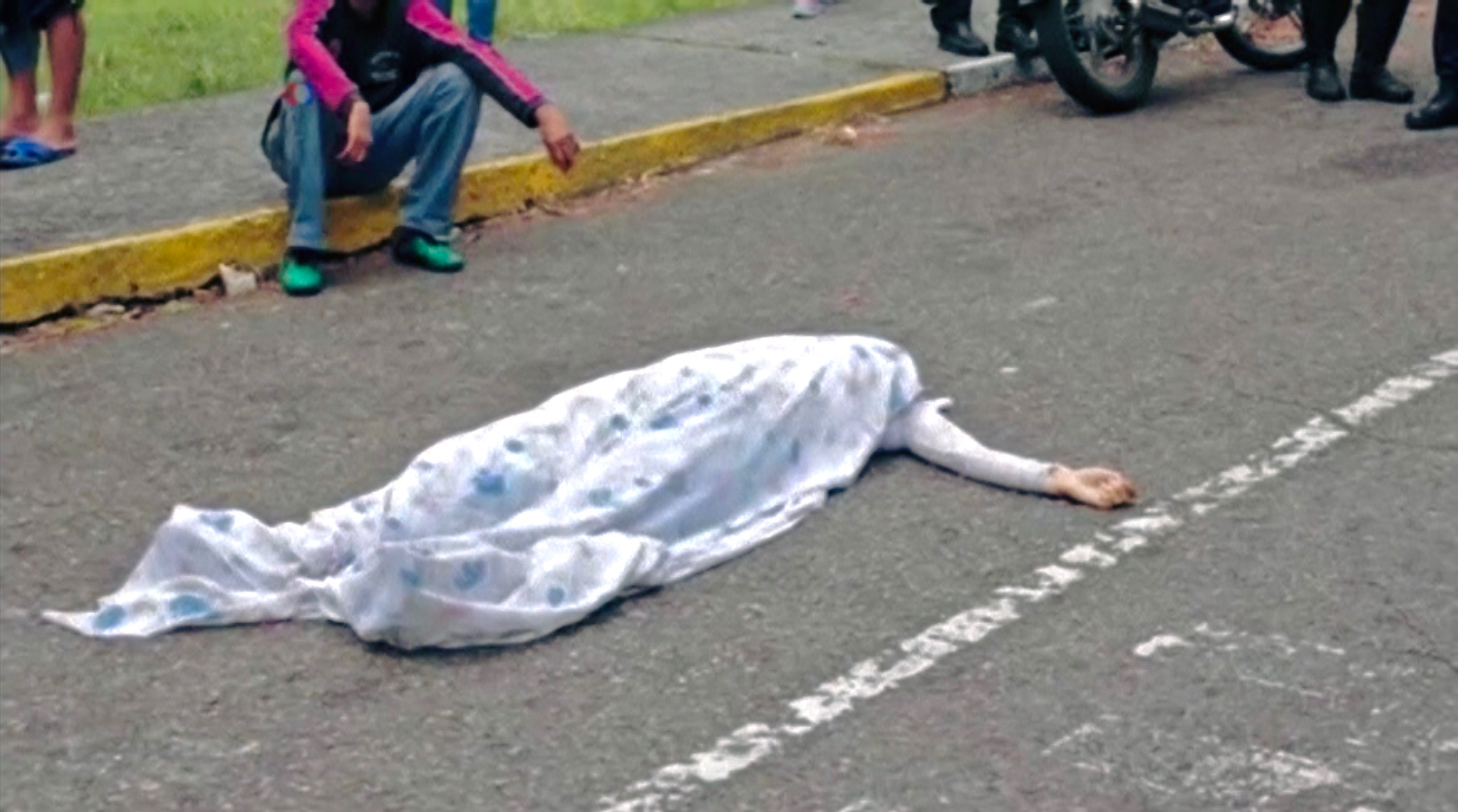
Body of a female protester, killed by colectivos in the Mother of All Marches during the 2017 Venezuelan protests

According to Venezuelan Community Abroad: A New Method of Exile, the Bolivarian government "would rather urge those who disagree with the revolution to leave, instead of pausing to think deeply about the damage this diaspora entails to the country". Newsweek reported that Chávez "has pushed hard against anyone" who was not part of his movement, resulting in large swaths of science, business, and media professionals emigrating from Venezuela.

Up to 9,000 Venezuelan exiles lived in the United States in 2014, with the number of exiles also increasing in the European Union. The Florida Center for Survivors of Torture reported in 2015 that most of those they assisted since the previous year were Venezuelan migrants, with the organization providing psychiatrists, social workers, interpreters, lawyers and doctors for dozens of individuals and their families.

== Effects ==
=== Education ===
Many Venezuelan emigrants are educated professionals. Iván de la Vega of the Simón Bolívar University (USB) found that 60 to 80 percent of students in Venezuela said that they want to leave the country and not return to 2015 conditions. Primary and secondary school students were also affected, with media reports of children at school fainting from hunger. In Venezuela's border regions, the school dropout rate is as high as 80 percent.

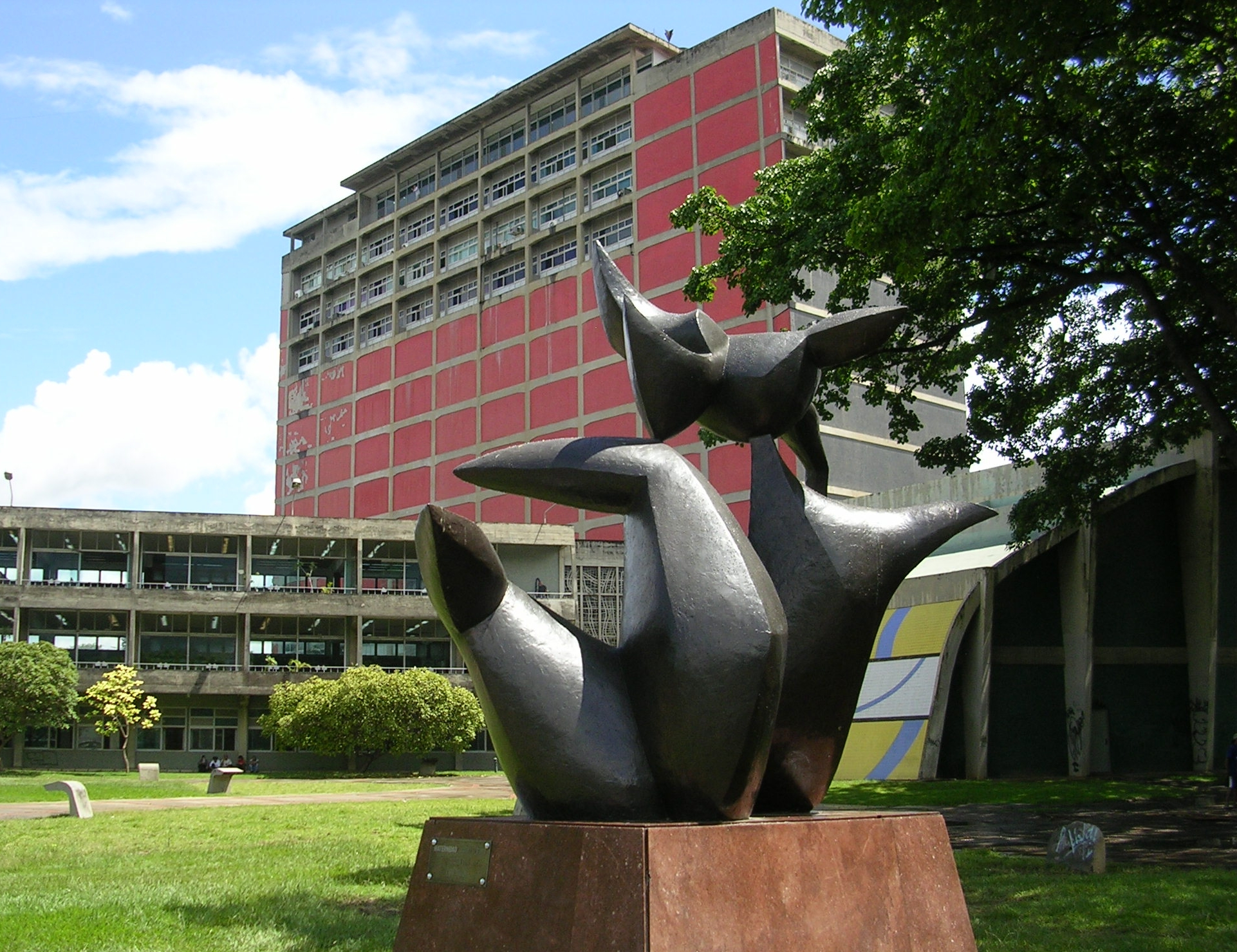
Central University of Venezuela, the country's most prominent university, saw a large percentage of its educators leave the country.

According to a 2014 report that Iván de la Vega wrote, about 1 million Venezuelans had emigrated during the Chávez presidency but the number of academics was unknown; UCV lost more than 700 of its 4,000 professors between 2011 and 2015. About 240 professors left USB between 2009 and 2014, with an additional 430 faculty members leaving from 2015 to 2017.

Major reasons for the emigration of educational professionals include Venezuela's crime rate and low government pay. According to the President of the Venezuelan Academy of Physical, Mathematical and Natural Sciences, Claudio Bifano, most of Venezuela's "technology and scientific capacity, built up over half a century" had been lost during Hugo Chávez's presidency. Despite 2 percent of the country's GDP being invested in science and technology, the number of papers published in international journals fell from about 1,600 to 1,000 (the 1997 figure, when Venezuela's technology budget was 0.3 percent of GDP) from 2008 to 2012.

Mariano Herrera, the director of the Centre for Cultural Research and Education, estimated a shortage by about 40 percent of that necessary for teachers of mathematics and science in 2014. The Venezuelan government attempted to ease the teacher shortage by creating the Simón Rodríguez Micromission, reducing graduation requirements for educational professionals to two years of studies. From January to March 2018, 102 of 120 positions at USB remained vacant.

The Venezuelan Community Abroad: A New Method of Exile study reported that over 90 percent of Venezuela's more than 1.5 million emigrants were college graduates; 40 percent had a master's degree, and 12 percent had doctorates or post-doctorate degrees. The study used official data verified abroad and surveys from Venezuelans who had decided to emigrate.

=== Economy ===
Businesspersons emigrated from Venezuela due to government price controls and corruption, shortages, and foreign exchange controls. Accountants and administrators left for countries experiencing economic growth, such as Argentina, Chile, Mexico, Peru, and the US. A Latin America Economic System study reported that the emigration of highly skilled laborers age 25 or older from Venezuela to OECD countries rose by 216 percent between 1990 and 2007.

An estimated 75 percent of about 20,000 PDVSA (Petróleos de Venezuela) workers who left the company emigrated to other countries for work. Former oil engineers began work on oil rigs in the North Sea and in the tar sands of western Canada; the number of Venezuelans in Alberta increased from 465 in 2001 to 3,860 in 2011. Former PDVSA employees also joined the more-successful oil industry in neighboring Colombia. According to El Universal, "thousands of oil engineers and technicians, adding up to hundreds of thousands of man-hours in training and expertise in the oil industry (more meaningful than academic degrees)", and most of PDVSA's former executives, are working abroad. After the PDVSA exodus, Venezuelan oil production decreased and work-related injuries increased.

By 2019, more than 50,000 engineers and architects had left Venezuela in the six preceding years, with some of the Venezuelan labor force being replaced by foreign workers, including Chinese counterparts.

=== Media and the arts ===
Actors, producers, TV presenters, news anchors, and journalists have reportedly left for Colombia, Florida, and Spain after the closing of media outlets by the Venezuelan government, or their purchase by government sympathizers. Musicians have emigrated to places receptive to their style of music.

=== Healthcare ===
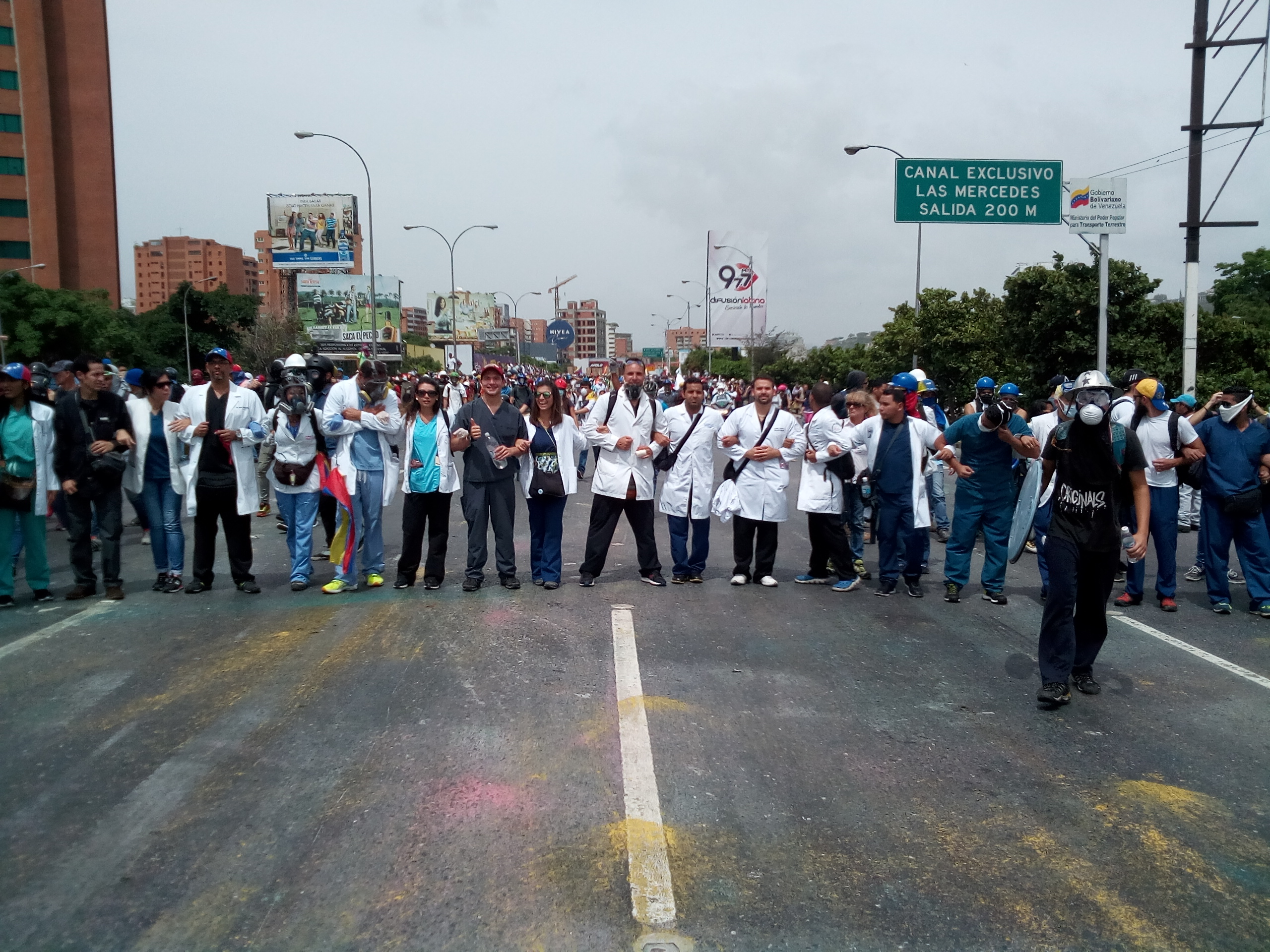
Venezuelan doctors protesting in Caracas 2017

Physicians and medical staff, particularly those in private facilities, emigrated due to low pay and lack of recognition following the Venezuelan government's opposition to traditional 6-year programs. The Bolivarian government instead supports Cuba's training of "community medical doctors". The government reportedly restricted access to facilities and funding for physician training, which led to medical programs closing across the country.

The Medical Federation of Venezuela's president, Douglas León Natera, said in April 2015 that more than 13,000 doctors (over 50 percent of the country's total) had emigrated. According to Natera, the resulting physician shortage affected public and private hospitals alike. In March 2018 (after 22,000 doctors had fled Venezuela), the salary of many physicians was less than US$10 per month.

In Latin American countries, the medical credentials of Venezuelan doctors are generally accepted. Opportunities for Venezuelans are limited in the United States, however, with physicians often becoming medical assistants or working in non-medical fields.

== Statistics ==
=== Migrant numbers ===
Venezuelan emigration in the Americas (cumulative)
Country	Jan. 2021	Nov. 2022
Colombia	1 771 501	2 477 588
Peru	1 043 460	1 490 673
Ecuador	432 345	508 935
United States	505 647	505 647
Chile	457 324	448 138
Brazil	262 475	388 120
Spain	189 110	278 159 (Note: Figure is from January 1, 2023)
Argentina	179 203	171 050
Panama	121 198	144 902
Dominican Republic	114 050	115 283
Mexico	101 648	87 152
Trinidad and Tobago	24 169	35 314
Costa Rica	29 820	29 906
Uruguay	14 926	23 390
Guyana	23 310	24 540
French Guiana	17 314	18 018
Aruba	17 000	17 000
Guadeloupe	14 000	14 000
Curaçao	14 000	14 000
Bolivia	5 822	13 776
Paraguay	4 934	6 107
Total	5,311,942	6,779,680

The median emigrant age is 32. The percentage of Venezuelans who said that they had family abroad increased from 10 percent in 2004 to nearly 30 percent in 2014. In 2014, about 10 percent said that they were presently preparing to emigrate. According to the UN High Commissioner for Refugees, "[b]etween 2003 and 2004, the number of (Venezuelan) refugees doubled from 598 to 1,256, and between 2004 and 2009, the number of Venezuelan refugees was five-fold higher, up to 6,221. By that date, there is also a log of 1,580 Venezuelan applicants for refuge."

A late-2017 survey by Consultores 21 found that over four million Venezuelans had left the country due to the Bolivarian Revolution, and 51 percent of young adults, mostly professionals said that they wanted to emigrate. In 2018, it was estimated that over one million Venezuelans had plans to emigrate. Emigrants primarily consist of professionals between 18 and 35.

According to the 2024 annual report by the Organisation for Economic Co-operation and Development (OECD), Venezuela recorded approximately 245,000 asylum applications worldwide, the highest number of any country that year. The report noted that political and economic instability in several Latin American countries, including Venezuela, continued to drive migration flows. Some analysts and regional governments argue that U.S. economic sanctions have contributed to financial pressures in Venezuela, thereby accelerating migration.

=== Characteristics of migrants ===
The characteristics of migrants drive and affect vulnerabilities and migration patterns. According to an IOM survey of Venezuelan migrants in Brazil, Colombia, and Peru from 2018, respondents in Brazil were of average age 32, respondents in Colombia and Peru were of average age 30, males were 58% of the surveyed population, 5% of women surveyed in Colombia were pregnant, 3% in Brazil, and 1% in Peru, 31% percent of respondents Brazil and 39% of respondents in Colombia reported being without any regular migration status, and 41% of the respondents in Brazil were traveling alone, 37% in Colombia and 31% in Peru. In a 2019 vulnerability study for migrants to Central America and the Caribbean, IOM found that 4% of respondents in the study were pregnant women, 32% of females said that they were affected by discrimination and 5% of these women were pregnant, 58% of females reported lack of healthcare access and 57% of males did, and 65% of respondents travel alone vs 35% travel in a group.

=== Colombian population ===
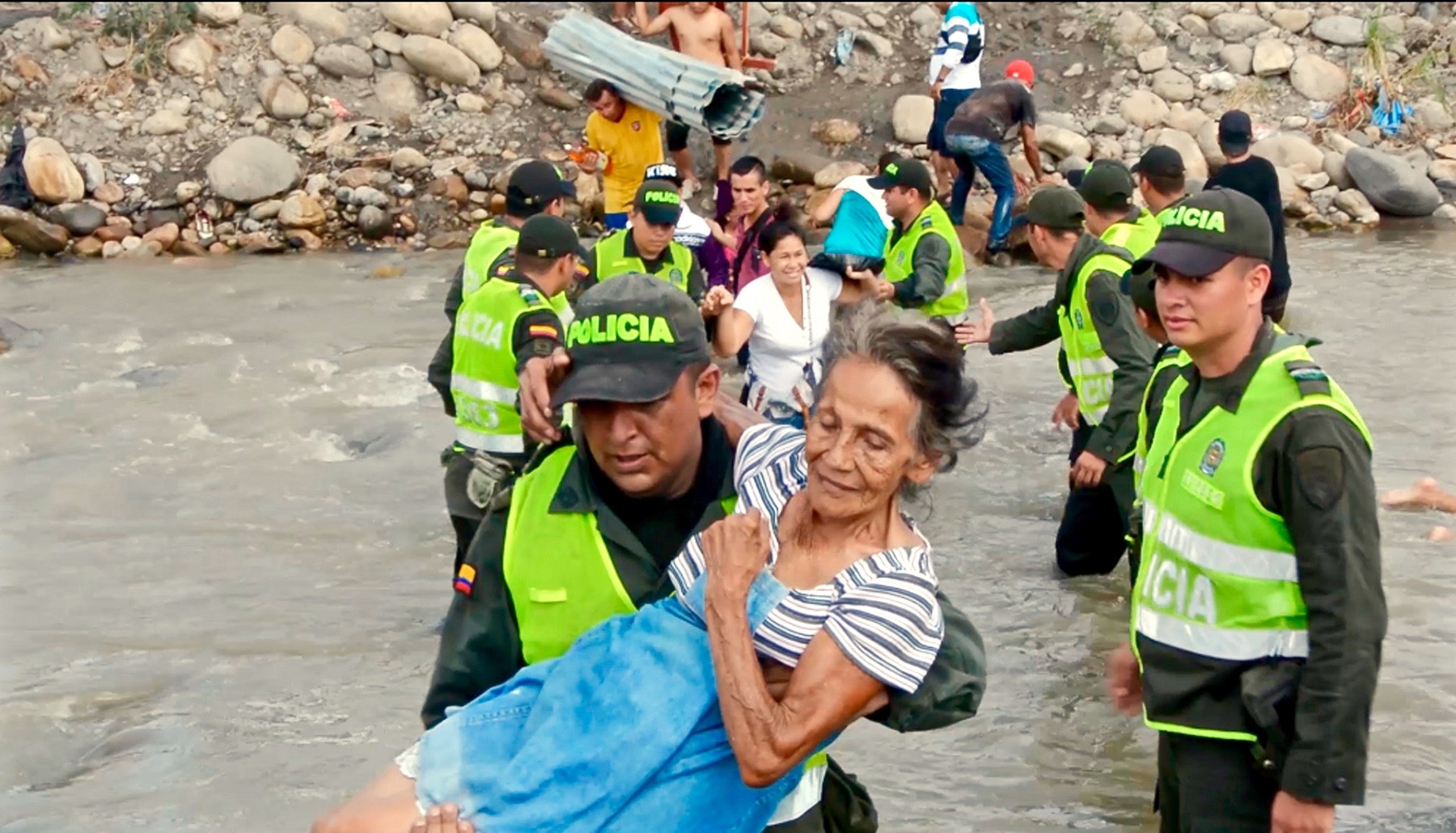
Colombian National Police officer carrying an elderly woman across the Táchira River into Colombia

According to Universidad de los Andes sociologist Raquel Alvarez, 77 percent of immigrants to Venezuela during the 1990s were from Colombia. By the early 2010s, the Colombian immigrants were disappointed with Venezuela's economic collapse and discrimination by the government and its supporters. Between tens of thousands and 200,000 Colombians left Venezuela in the years before 2015. The Colombian Ministry of Foreign Affairs reported that visas to Colombia increased by 150 percent between March 2014 and March 2015, and repatriation assistance of Colombian-Venezuelans reached a record number in the first quarter of 2015. Martin Gottwald, deputy head of the United Nations refugee agency in Colombia, said that many of the 205,000 Colombian refugees who had fled to Venezuela may return to Colombia. The number of repatriating Colombians concerned the Colombian government, due to its effect on unemployment and public services.

=== Jewish population ===
The Jewish population in Venezuela has, according to several community organizations, declined from an estimated 18,000–22,000 in the year 2000 to about 9,000 in 2010. Community leaders cite the economy, security, and increased antisemitism as major reasons for the decline. Some have accused the government of engaging in, or supporting, antisemitic action and rhetoric. In 2015, it was reported that the Jewish population had declined to 7,000.

== Refugee life ==
=== Aid ===
Organizations and events have been created to assist Venezuelan emigrants. The website MeQuieroIr.com (Spanish: "I want to go") was created by a former public-affairs employee of PDVSA who moved to Canada, and quickly became popular among Venezuelan emigrants. In June 2015, the first annual Migration Expo was held in Caracas; the event included support groups, study-abroad assistance, and help with the emigration process. The Somos Diáspora network, consisting of a website and radio station in Lima, Peru, was launched in May 2018 to provide Venezuelan entertainment, news and migration information to the diaspora.

=== Problems ===
==== Discrimination ====
Venezuelan refugees have occasionally faced xenophobia and discrimination in destination countries. The International Organization for Migration has increased awareness that refugees are vulnerable to trafficking and prostitution. Venezuelans in Panama experience xenophobia due to competition with local residents, and Panamanian nationalist movements have used anti-Venezuelan-refugee rhetoric to gain support.

Discrimination toward Venezuelans has occasionally been a problem in Ecuador, and in a 2019 survey of Venezuelans and other migrant groups in the capital city of Quito, about half of Venezuelans reported that they had experienced discrimination since coming to Ecuador (compared to 62% of surveyed Colombian migrants in Quito who said the same thing).

In Brazil, at least 1,200 Venezuelans were forced from refugee camps by residents of Pacaraima on August 18, 2018, after the family of a local merchant told the authorities that he had been assaulted by a group of Venezuelans. However, two days later the authorities said the assailants' identity and nationality had not been confirmed. The residents of the city destroyed the migrant camps.

==== Prostitution ====
Many Venezuelan women in Colombia resort to prostitution to earn a living. In "La Chama", a Panamanian hit song by Mr. Saik, the singer mocks a Venezuelan woman that resorts to prostitution; the singer received death threats from aggrieved migrants. Educated Venezuelan emigrants have also turned to prostitution because they can no longer continue the careers they pursued.

=== Health ===
==== Infectious diseases ====
The re-emergence of measles, and other communicable diseases as a result of Venezuela's physician shortage raised concerns in destination countries that refugees would spread disease throughout the region. Measles outbreaks occurred in Brazil, Colombia, and Ecuador in areas in which Venezuelan refugees lived; most of the infected were refugees. Increases in malaria and diphtheria in Venezuela have also raised concerns in neighboring countries. As of August 2019, Venezuelan migrants will be given regional vaccination cards to make sure they receive vaccines and are not given double doses. This move was agreed by health officials from the United States, Colombia, Ecuador, Panama, Canada, Haiti, the Dominican Republic, Argentina, Peru and Paraguay.

==== Mental health ====
Many Venezuelan refugees suffer from posttraumatic stress disorder due to the traumatic events they have experienced within their native country. Migrants experience both physical and psychological symptoms from their traumas which are caused by violence in Venezuela, leaving relatives behind, and adapting to the culture of their host countries. Some of the main causes of hospitalization among Venezuelan refugees in Peru are mental health related.

==== Child refugees ====
The Refugee and Migrant Needs Analysis (RMNA) for 2023 revealed that 19% of refugee and migrant children were unable to attend school due to working jobs in order to support their families. Organizations such as UNICEF have responded to the crisis in ten Latin American Countries and reached 105,219 children in need of protective services. Through this aid, 87,410 children gained access to education and 147,764 children and mothers accessed safe water.

=== Traveling ===
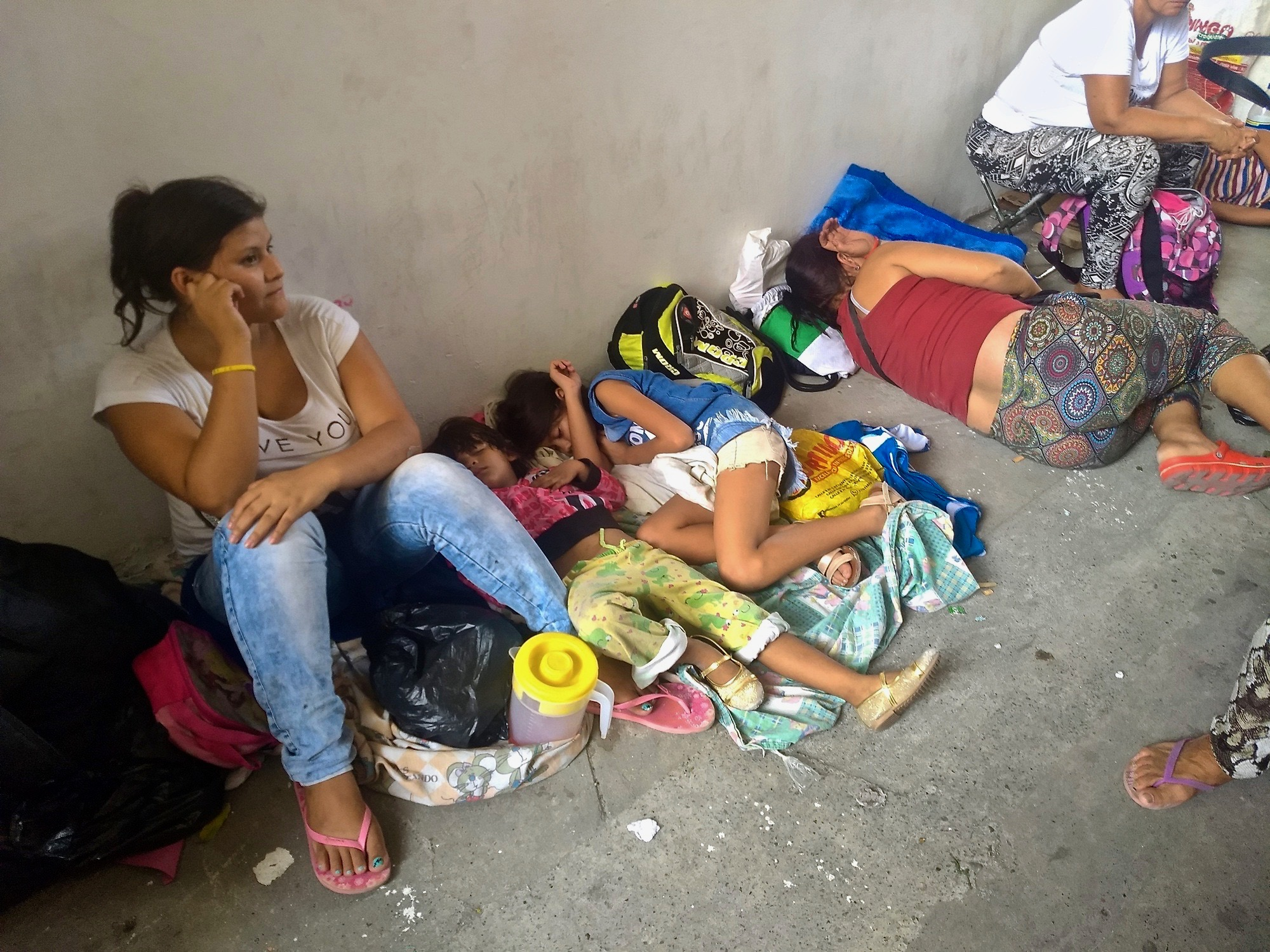
Venezuelan refugees sleeping on the streets of Cúcuta, Colombia

Venezuelans have emigrated in a number of ways, and images of migrants fleeing by sea have been compared to Cuban exiles. Many refugees travel by foot for thousands of miles due to their inability to afford other travel methods, trekking over mountain ranges, walking distances on highways towing suitcases, hitchhiking when able and fording rivers to escape the crisis. The majority begin their travels at the border town of Cucuta, Colombia and then leave to their individual destinations. Refugees are also susceptible to fake travel guides and robberies along their journey.

Those who leave by foot are known as los caminantes (the walkers); the walk to Bogotá, Colombia is 350 miles, and some walk hundreds of miles further, to Ecuador or Peru. Alba Pereira, who helps feed and clothe about 800 walkers daily in Northern Colombia, said in 2019 she is seeing more sick, elderly and pregnant among the walkers. The Colombian Red Cross has set up rest tents with food and water on the side of the roads for Venezuelans. Venezuelans also cross into northern Brazil, where UNHCR has set up 10 shelters to house thousands of Venezuelans. Images of Venezuelans fleeing the country by sea have raised symbolic comparisons to the images seen from the Cuban diaspora.

Venezuelan migrants have entered Chile from Bolivia through the Altiplano locality of Colchane. The route walked by migrants is arid, cold and lies at 3,600 meters above sea level. This route is chosen since the more direct, and less harsh route across the Chile–Peru border is better guarded. Migrants are aided in the crossing by human smugglers. By February 2021 the cost for a family to be crossed from Bolivia into Chile was between US$200 and US$500. Migrants have been accused by the alcalde of Colchane and local residents of acting violently by forcing themselves into inhabited houses of Colchane, engaging in theft and occupying public spaces.

== Destinations ==
The number and characteristics of people leaving Venezuela can be hard to track. General estimates have been made that capture the scale of the migration. Migration flow from Venezuela to significant destinations (which include most of Latin America, North America, and parts of Europe) has increased from 380,790 in 2005 to 1,580,022 in 2017 (IOM, 2018a), where the estimates are based on each receiving government estimation. There are many migrants who enter a receiving country with regular status, but there are many who do not. The number of those who enter irregularly is difficult to estimate because of their immigration status.

The top ten destinations (significant destinations) for Venezuelan emigrants are Colombia, Peru, the United States, Spain, Italy, Portugal, Argentina, Canada, France, and Panama. Tens of thousands of Venezuelans have also moved to other locations, including Trinidad and Tobago and other countries in the Americas and Europe.

Venezuelans have fled to over 90 countries in pursuit of a better life. Between 2015 and 2017, Venezuelan immigration increased by 1,388% in Chile, 1,132% in Colombia, 1,016% in Peru, 922% in Brazil, 344% in Argentina and Ecuador, 268% in Panama, 225% in Uruguay, 104% in Mexico, 38% in Costa Rica, 26% in Spain, and 14% in the United States.

=== United States ===
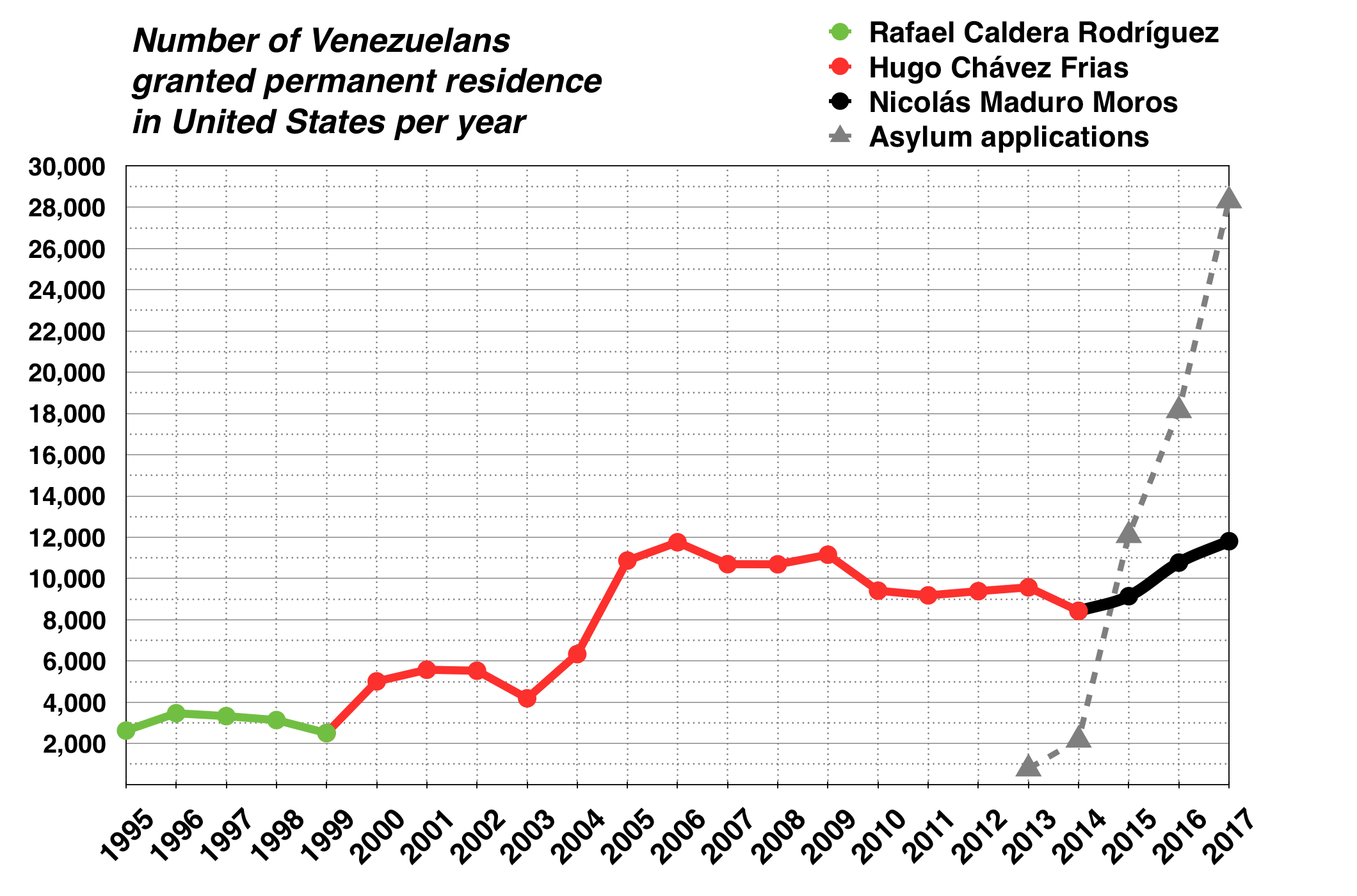
Number of Venezuelans granted permanent residence in the United States per year (by Venezuelan president), with asylum applications (per United States Department of Homeland Security)

The United States is one of the main destinations for Venezuelan emigrants. The number of U.S. residents who identified as Venezuelan increased by 135 percent between 2000 and 2010, from 91,507 to 215,023. In 2015, it was estimated that about 260,000 Venezuelans had emigrated to the United States. According to researcher Carlos Subero, "[t]he vast majority of Venezuelans trying to migrate enter the country with a non-immigrant tourist or business visa", statistics showing that 527,907 Venezuelans remain in the United States with non-immigrant visas. The Latin American and Caribbean Economic System (SELA) reported that in 2007, 14 percent of Venezuelans 25 and older in the United States had a doctoral degree; above the U.S. average of nine percent.

The largest community of Venezuelans in the United States lives in South Florida. Between the years 2000 and 2012, the number of legal Venezuelan residents in Florida increased from 91,500 to 259,000.

Before October 2022, Venezuelans seeking asylum could enter the United States through land borders, and could reside in the United States while their cases are being assessed. However, around October 12, 2022, the United States announced Venezuelans entering "between ports of entry, without authorization, will be returned to Mexico". The United States also announced that Venezuelans entering lawfully would be eligible for a new humanitarian program, if they have a sponsor in the United States, with the new program capped at up to 24,000 Venezuelans.

The Venezuelan migrant crisis is renowned globally. According to the United Nations High Commissioner for Refugees, over 7.3 million Venezuelans have left their home country in 2023, making it one of the most significant displacements worldwide. The absence of active Venezuelan consulates in the U.S., due to diplomatic tensions, has further complicated the situation for Venezuelans needing official documents.

==== TPS for Venezuelans ====
The situation in Venezuela has been a focal point of international concern due to its prolonged political, economic, and humanitarian crisis. As a result of this unrest and instability, many Venezuelans have sought refuge in various countries, including the United States.

Recognizing the deteriorating conditions in Venezuela, the U.S. government extended Temporary Protected Status (TPS) to Venezuelans. This designation allows Venezuelan nationals (and individuals without nationality who last habitually resided in Venezuela) who are already in the United States to stay and work legally for a specified period.

The value of the humanitarian permits is further diminished when viewed against the broader policy backdrop. Deportations under Title 42 mean many deserving asylum seekers lose their right to request protection. A significant number of Venezuelans qualify for asylum, a reality Biden acknowledged last year when designating Venezuela for Temporary Protected Status (TPS). However, the decision to swiftly deport Venezuelans is a violation of the asylum rights of a population Biden acknowledged as vulnerable and deserving of protection through the TPS.

The Biden Justice Department continues to advocate for the suspension of Title 42, a move previously blocked by the courts. Yet, paradoxically, the administration has chosen to make this rule the cornerstone of its new strategy to control Venezuelan migration. Whatever the rationale behind this pivot, the plan not only impacts Venezuelan migrants but also transit countries like Panama and Costa Rica, lacking resources and infrastructure to handle these migration waves, and Mexico, where migrant shelters on the border were already stretched thin before the announcement.

Starting in February 2025, The Second Trump administration has taken steps to revoke TPS for Venezuelans, however, the planned change was blocked by a federal judge in September 2025, and litigation remains ongoing.

Key Events:

- March 2021: The Biden administration announced the designation of TPS for Venezuela, expecting to benefit an estimated 300,000 Venezuelans residing in the U.S. The TPS designation would last for 18 months, allowing those eligible to stay and work legally in the U.S. during that time frame.
- July 2022: The U.S. Department of Homeland Security (DHS) extended TPS for Venezuelans. This 18-month extension came into effect on September 10, 2022, and would last until March 10, 2024.
- September 2023: The Biden administration announced further support for Venezuelans in the U.S. by expanding the TPS designation. This decision aimed to provide humanitarian assistance and enable more Venezuelans to access work permits. The announcement came in the context of increased Venezuelan migration to major cities, notably contributing to the New York City migrant housing crisis. This surge in arrivals strained relations between President Joe Biden and New York City Mayor Eric Adams, who criticized the federal government's handling of the migration crisis.

=== Latin America and the Caribbean ===
Latin American countries, such as Argentina, Brazil, Chile, Colombia, Dominican Republic, Ecuador, Mexico, Peru and Panama, are popular destinations for Venezuelan emigrants.

==== Argentina ====
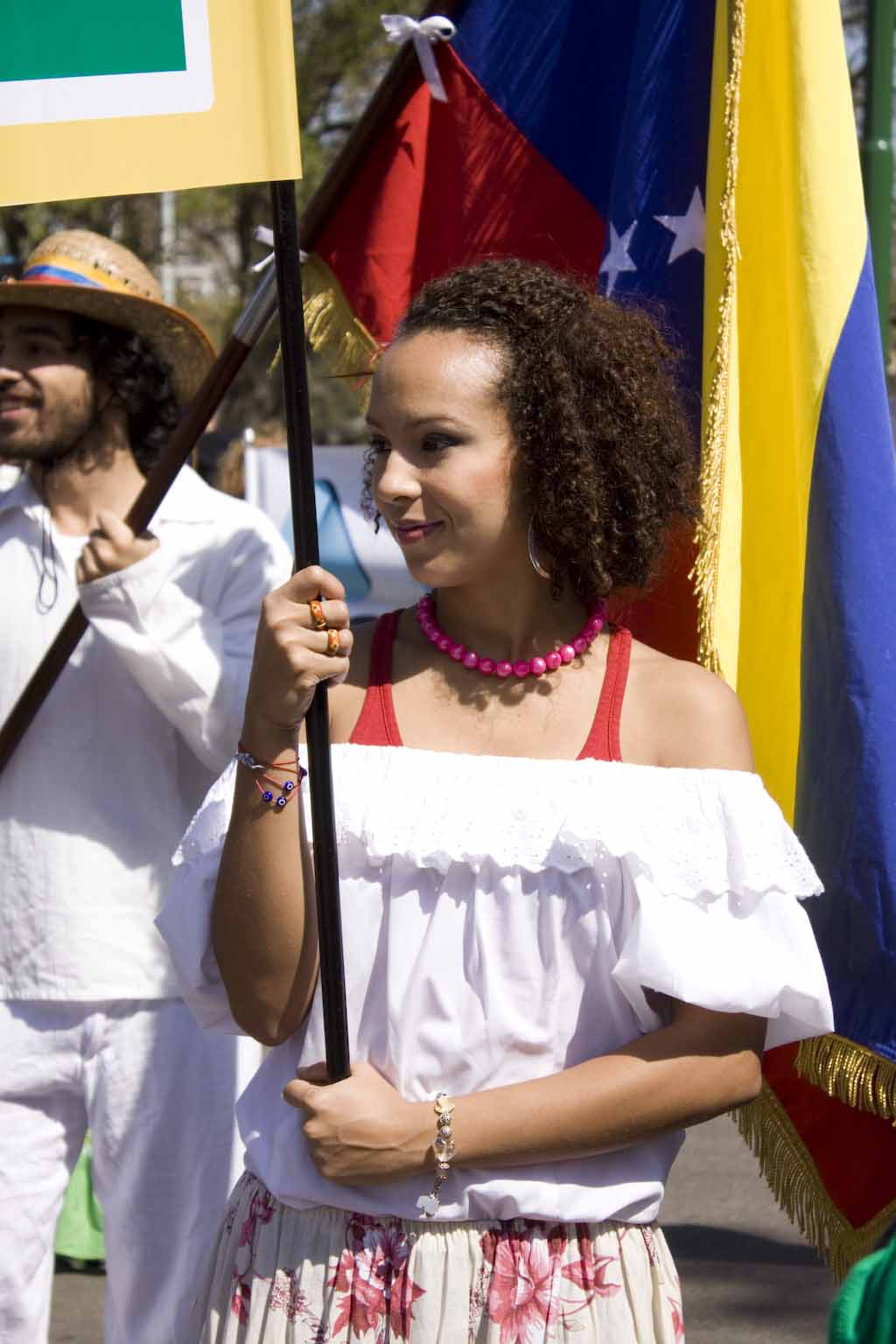
Celebrating Immigrants' Day in Buenos Aires

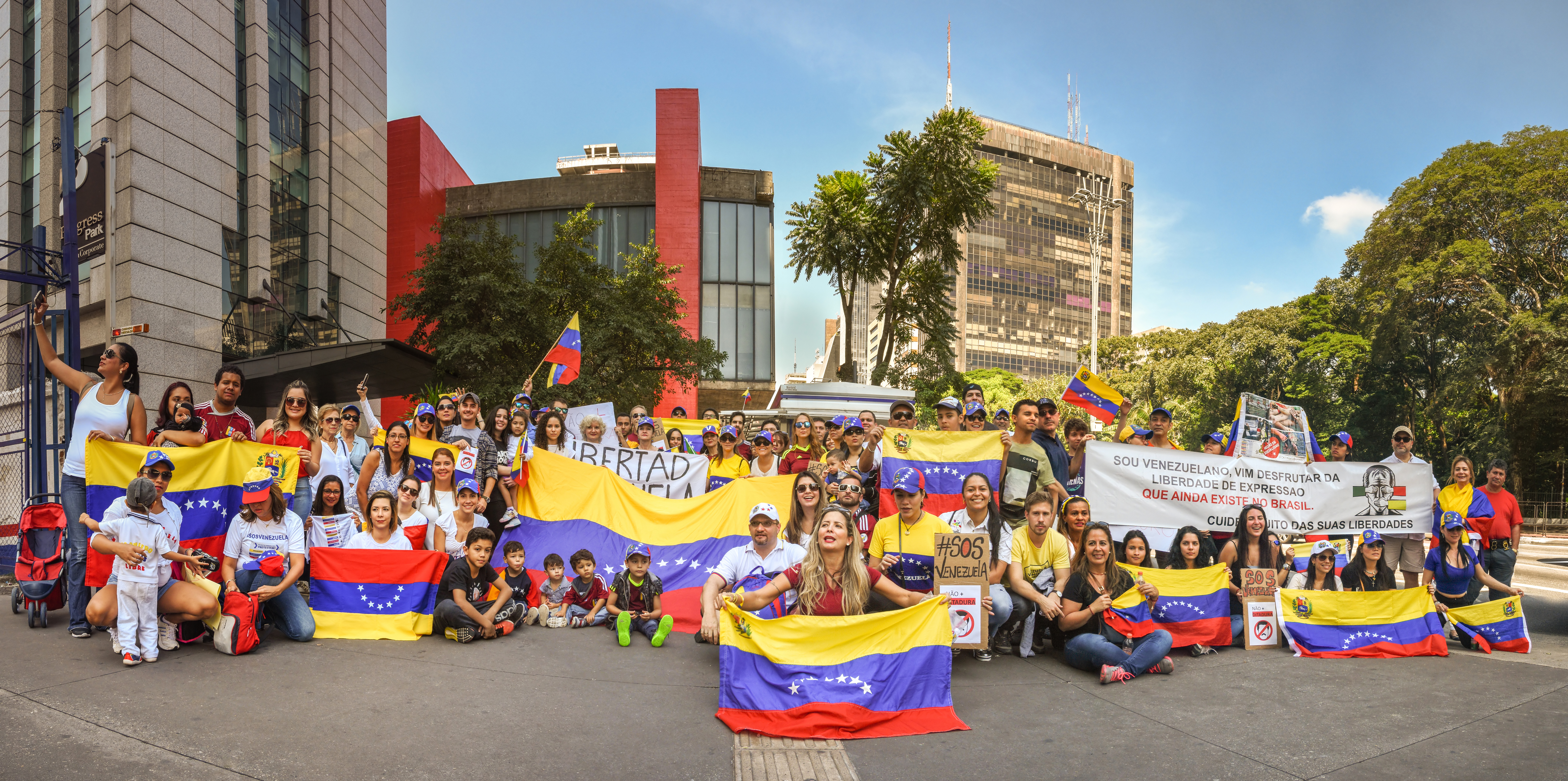
Venezuelans in a protest against the Bolivarian Revolution in São Paulo, Brazil

Venezuelan immigration has increased significantly since 2005, from 148 people annually to 12,859 in 2016. Over 15,000 Venezuelans emigrated to Argentina from 2004 to 2014, of whom 4,781 have obtained permanent residency. The number of Venezuelan immigrants increased by 500 percent from 2014 to 2016, to 600 per week. Between 2014 and mid-2017, 38,540 Venezuelans filed residency applications in Argentina.

Venezuelans emigrating to Argentina face several obstacles, such as the cost of plane fare, due to the distance between the countries compared to that of the neighboring Colombia and Brazil. Attracted by better living conditions, many risk the trip by land; Marjorie Campos, a Venezuelan woman who was eight months pregnant, traveled by bus for 11 days across Colombia, Ecuador, Peru and Chile to reach the Argentine city of Cordoba.

President Javier Milei has implemented a series of restrictive immigration policies that specifically target individuals associated with the Maduro administration while simultaneously tightening general rules for all migrants.

==== Brazil ====
We're at the start of an unprecedented humanitarian crisis in this part of the Amazon ... We're already seeing Venezuelan lawyers working as supermarket cashiers, Venezuelan women resorting to prostitution, indigenous Venezuelans begging at traffic intersections.

— Col. Edvaldo Amara, Roraima civil-defense chief

Testimony of a Venezuelan immigrant about her first days in São Paulo, March 2017 (in Spanish, with English subtitles)

As socioeconomic conditions worsened, many Venezuelans emigrated to neighboring Brazil. Tens of thousands of refugees traveled through the Amazon basin seeking a better life, some traveling by foot and paying over $1,000 to be smuggled into larger cities. The Brazilian government increased its military presence on the border to assist refugees on its roads and rivers. Over 70,000 refugees entered the border state of Roraima in northern Brazil in late 2016, straining local resources. Hundreds of children from Venezuela are enrolled in schools near the Brazil-Venezuela border, and about 800 Venezuelans entered Brazil daily by 2018.

On August 7, 2018, the regional government requested that the Supreme Federal Court of Brazil close the border, and later that day the Supreme Federal Court denied the request on constitutional grounds.

The Brazilian Army launched in February 2018 Operação Acolhida, that aims to protect Venezuelans crossing the border, providing humanitarian aid to immigrants in vulnerable situations.

===== Yanomami Humanitarian Crisis =====
The Yanomami, an indigenous tribe residing in the Amazon region spanning between Brazil and Venezuela, have faced a dire humanitarian crisis in recent years. On the Brazilian side, over 570 Yanomami children have perished in less than four years due to health issues like malnutrition and malaria. This community, which has resided in this region for generations, partly attributes their suffering to the invasion of over 20,000 illegal miners since 2019.

Simultaneously, Venezuela's political and economic crisis has amplified the migratory flow to Brazil, bringing added challenges for the roughly 20,000 Yanomami living in Venezuelan territory. Many, seeking refuge and better living conditions, end up moving to the Brazilian side. Food scarcity and the dearth of healthcare services afflict the indigenous community in both Venezuela and Brazil.

In January 2023, the situation in Brazil caught international attention. President Luiz Inácio Lula da Silva accused his predecessor, Jair Bolsonaro, of committing genocide against the Yanomami. This grave charge emerged after the alarming death toll of children under five within the community. In response, Lula declared a state of healthcare emergency, and the Supreme Federal Court (STF) of Brazil ordered an investigation into Bolsonaro. In Lula's words, shared on his social media: "More than a humanitarian crisis, what I witnessed in Roraima was genocide, a premeditated crime against the Yanomami, perpetrated by a government indifferent to the suffering of the Brazilian people.".

Images disseminated by the international press vividly showcase the severity of the situation: Yanomami children with swollen bellies and skin clinging to ribs, revealing the famine and critical health state of the populace.

Seeking international support, Darío Kopenawa, a Yanomami leader from Brazil, visited the headquarters of the Organization of American States (OAS) in the United States in February 2023. His testimony was poignant about the alarming situation during Bolsonaro's tenure: "We've been discussing our people's situation for many years. About the issues with the invaders [illegal miners]. Violence is on the rise, as are sexual abuses on Yanomami land. Prostitution, alcoholism, and miner threats are commonplace. We endured all of this intensely in the last four years under Bolsonaro's governance. He didn't protect us.".

This scenario underscores the vulnerability of indigenous communities against economic and political interests, as well as the repercussions of Venezuelan migration, underlining the pressing need for measures to protect their rights and way of life.

==== Colombia ====
Colombia, a country that borders Venezuela and has a long history with the country, has received the largest number of Venezuelan migrants. Following the reopening of the Colombian border after the 2015 Venezuela–Colombia migrant crisis, many Venezuelans began to emigrate into the country. Since then, Colombia has accepted many Venezuelan refugees and has attempted to give legal status to them. The aid provided by the Colombian government to Venezuelan refugees has been costly, and multiple international partners have intervened to provide assistance. Assistance provided by Colombia to Venezuelans ranges from emergency room visits to public education for children; all provided by the Colombian government for free. In August 2019, then President of Colombia Iván Duque announced that Colombia would grant citizenship to 24,000 children born in Colombia to migrant Venezuelan parents, in order to prevent them from being stateless.

In July 2016, over 200,000 Venezuelans entered Colombia to purchase goods due to shortages in Venezuela. On August 12, 2016, the Venezuelan government officially reopened the border; thousands of Venezuelans again entered Colombia to escape the nationwide crisis. Colombia's oil industry has benefited from skilled Venezuelan immigrants, although the country began deporting unauthorized immigrants in late 2016.

According to the Colombian government, more than 100,000 Venezuelans emigrated to Colombia in the first half of 2017. In the run-up to the 2017 Venezuelan Constituent Assembly elections, Colombia granted a Special Permit of Permanent Residence to Venezuelan citizens who entered the country before July 25; over 22,000 Venezuelans applied for permanent residence in the permit's first 24 hours of receiving applications. By the end of November 2017, over 660,000 Venezuelans were in Colombia, twice as many as there had been in June. At the end of 2018, there were more than 1.2 million Venezuelans in Colombia. Between April and June of the 2018, Colombia registered more than 442,000 Venezuelans who were irregularly in the country through a registration process called RAMV. Beginning in January 2020, the Colombian government announced it would offer work permits to hundreds of thousands of Venezuelans living in Colombia, allowing them to integrate into the formal economy. The influx of refugees has caused an increase in xenophobia by some Colombians, who blame the refugees for rising crime, unemployment and the spread of COVID-19. In December 2020, then Colombian President Duque announced that undocumented Venezuelan migrants would not receive vaccinations for the coronavirus despite concerns from refugee agencies.

In February 2021, the government of Colombia announced the legalization of undocumented Venezuelan migrants in the country, making them eligible to receive 10-year residency permits.

==== Costa Rica ====
The number of Venezuelan asylum seekers in the country increased from only 200 in 2015 to 1,423 in 2016, going up to 2,600 in 2017; this has been a subject that discussed jointly by the governments of both Costa Rica and Panama in a bilateral summit. Of the total of 6,337 refugee applications in the country in 2017, 50% were from Venezuelans.

==== Chile ====
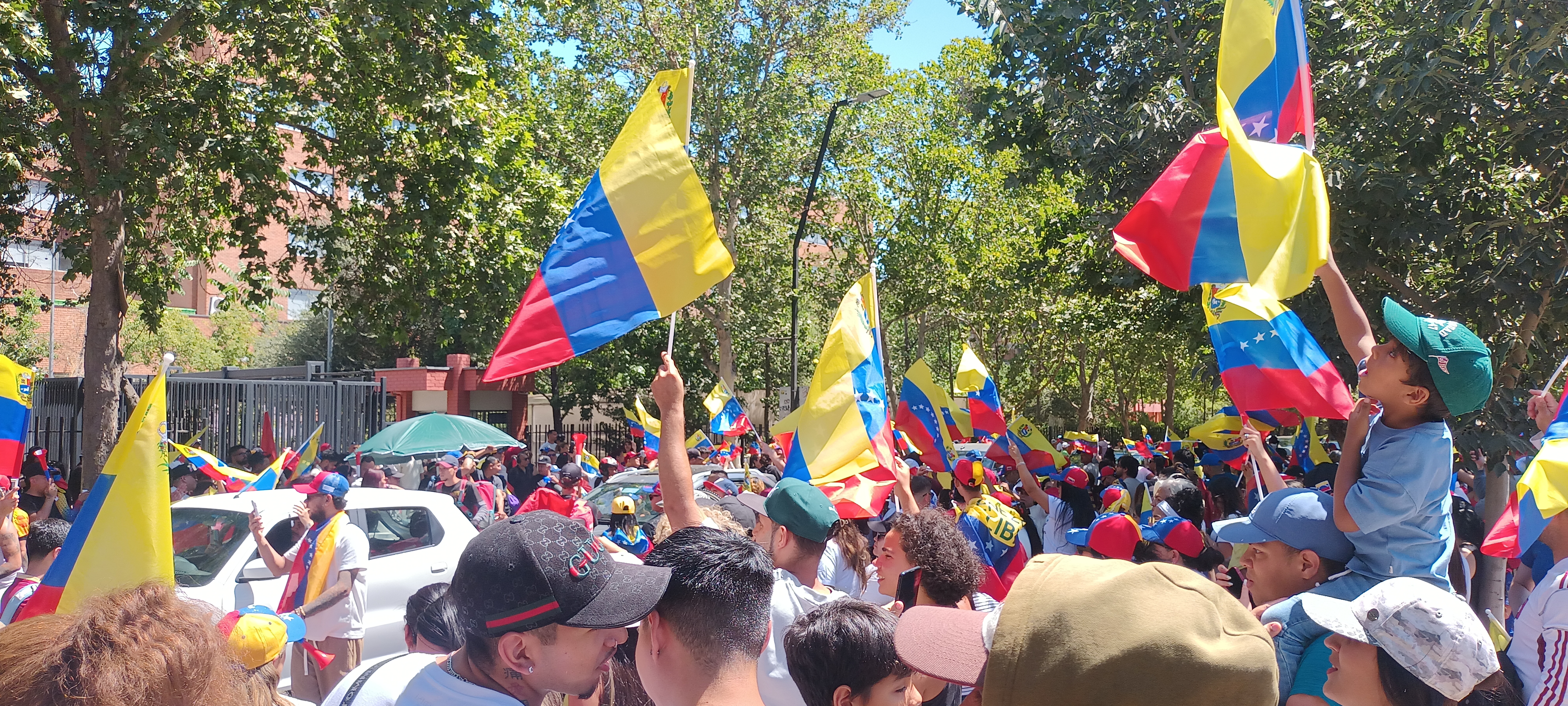
Venezuelans in Santiago, Chile, celebrating the news of Nicolás Maduro's capture, January 3, 2026

Between 2015 and 2017, Venezuelan emigration to Chile increased by 1,388 percent. In 2016, Venezuelans emigrated to Chile due to its stable economy and simple immigration policy. According to the Chilean Department for Foreigners and Migration, the number of Chilean visas for Venezuelans increased from 758 in 2011 to 8,381 in 2016; 90 percent were work visas for Venezuelans aged 20 to 35. Since international travel by air is difficult (especially due to the value of the Venezuelan bolívar), many Venezuelans must travel overland through dangerous terrain to reach Chile. After arriving, they must start a new life. According to Catholic Chilean Migration Institute executive secretary Delio Cubides, most Venezuelan immigrants "are accountants, engineers, teachers, the majority of them very well-educated" but accept low-paying jobs so they can meet visa requirements and remain in the country.

A 2021 report by Chile's National Institute of Statistics estimates that by December 2020 about 448.800 Venezuelans live in the country, or 30.7 percent of Chile's immigrant population. This constitutes a raise of 34 percent in comparison to 2018, when 288.940 Venezuelans lived in Chile.

In late 2025, President-elect José Antonio Kast made the mass deportation of undocumented migrants—the majority of whom are Venezuelans—a central pillar of his incoming administration.

==== Ecuador ====
Ecuador was the third-largest recipient of Venezuelan migrants in the hemisphere as of 2021, after Colombia and Peru. While Ecuador has had a history of progressive and relatively welcoming policies toward migrants, the response toward the newer Venezuelan population has been more mixed, and then-president Lenin Moreno imposed visa and other documentation requirements on entering Venezuelans that were difficult to meet. Venezuelans in Ecuador have been relatively well-organized, forming humanitarian associations and engaging with the media to shape popular perceptions of this population among Ecuadorians. Then President-elect of Ecuador, Guillermo Lasso, anticipated that he will seek to regularize the situation of over 400,000 Venezuelan residents in the country once he takes office.

In September 2025, Daniel Noboa's administration terminated a 15-year-old bilateral agreement with Venezuela that had provided a simplified visa and residency process. Noboa has significantly shifted Ecuador’s migration policy toward stricter controls, with a particular focus on Venezuelan nationals.

==== Mexico ====
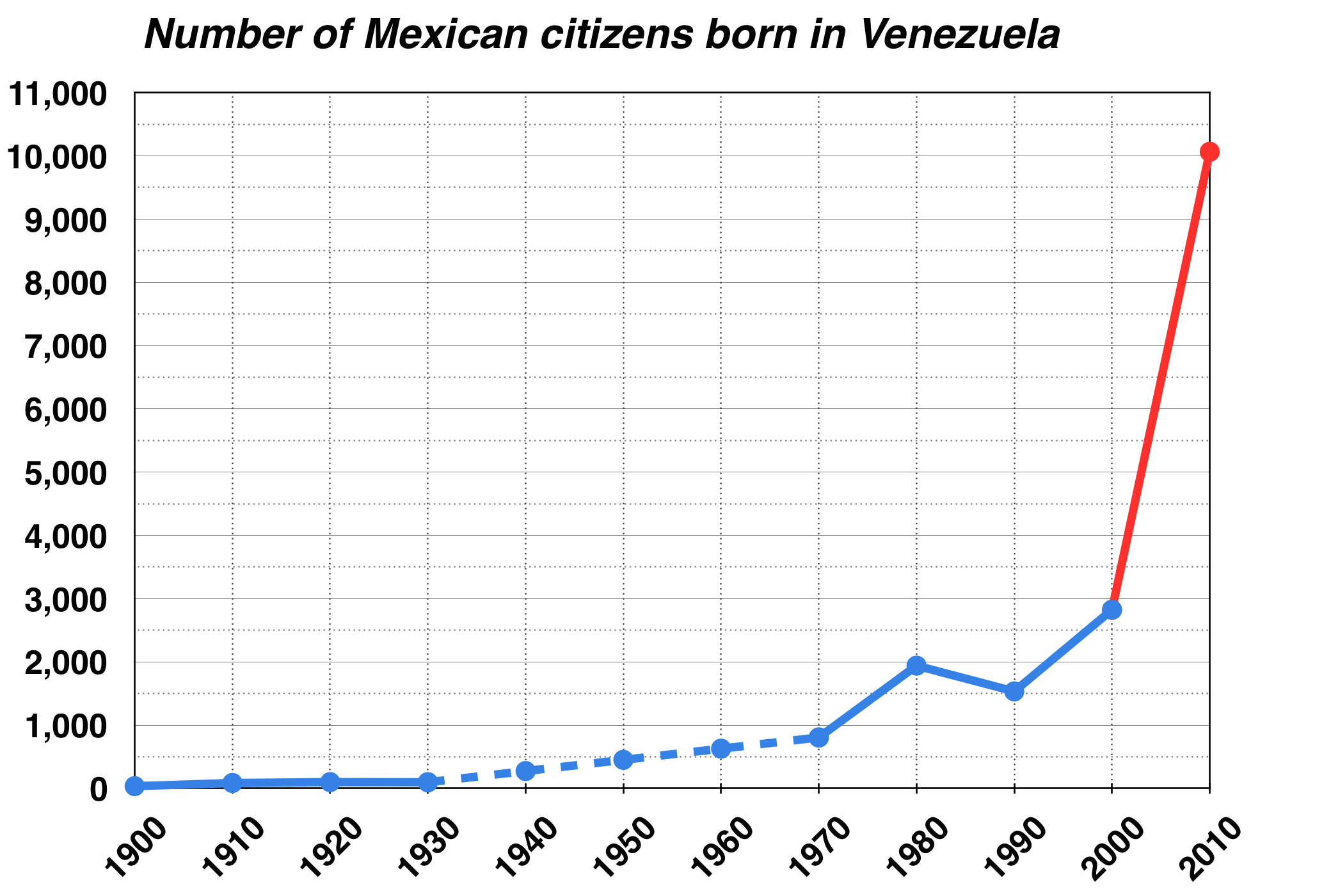
Broken line represents simulated data (source: INEGI).

The Venezuelan population in Mexico increased from 2,823 in 2000 to 10,063 in 2010, a 357 percent increase in Venezuelan-born people living in Mexico. Mexico granted 975 Venezuelans permanent identification cards in the first five months of 2014, double the number of ID cards issued in 2013. The Mexican government claims that 47,000 Venezuelans currently reside in Mexico.

In 2024, Venezuelans were the largest national group (377,401) among nearly 1.4 million undocumented migrants detected by Mexican authorities between January and May. Mexico subsequently tightened border controls and restricted transit permits. In February 2025, the government also deployed 10,000 additional National Guard troops to its borders. Irregular entries into Mexico fell by 87.5% in 2025 compared with 2024, and many Venezuelans remained stranded in southern Mexico.

==== Dutch Caribbean islands ====
Once a tourist and vacation destination for Venezuelans, the islands of Aruba and Curaçao require Venezuelan citizens to have at least $1,000 USD in cash prior to immigrating, which is over five years' income for a Venezuelan working a minimum-wage job. Patrols and deportation of Venezuelans have increased, and Aruba has dedicated a stadium to hold up to 500 Venezuelan migrants facing deportation.

The journey to Curaçao is an often-dangerous 60-mile (97 km) trip that includes dangerous waters monitored by the Dutch Caribbean Coast Guard as well as armed gangs. Venezuelans are brought near the island's shore, dumped overboard and forced to swim to land, where they meet contacts to set up their new lives. Curaçao authorities state that common jobs held by Venezuelans on the islands are to serve tourists, with their work ranging from cleaning restaurants to being active in the islands' sex trade. The Dutch Caribbean Coast Guard estimates that only five to ten percent of boats carrying Venezuelan migrants are intercepted.

In 2019, recently arrived Venezuelan refugees were estimated to number around 17,000 on Aruba, accounting for some 15% of the island's population.

On August 21, 2020, according to Human Rights Watch, Venezuelan migrants detained in Aruban detention centers were reported of facing dangerous COVID-19 risks. Several media outlets and human rights organizations have reported poor conditions, including overcrowding of cells, violence from the guards, and lack of basic hygiene products for Venezuelan migrants in detention.

==== Peru ====
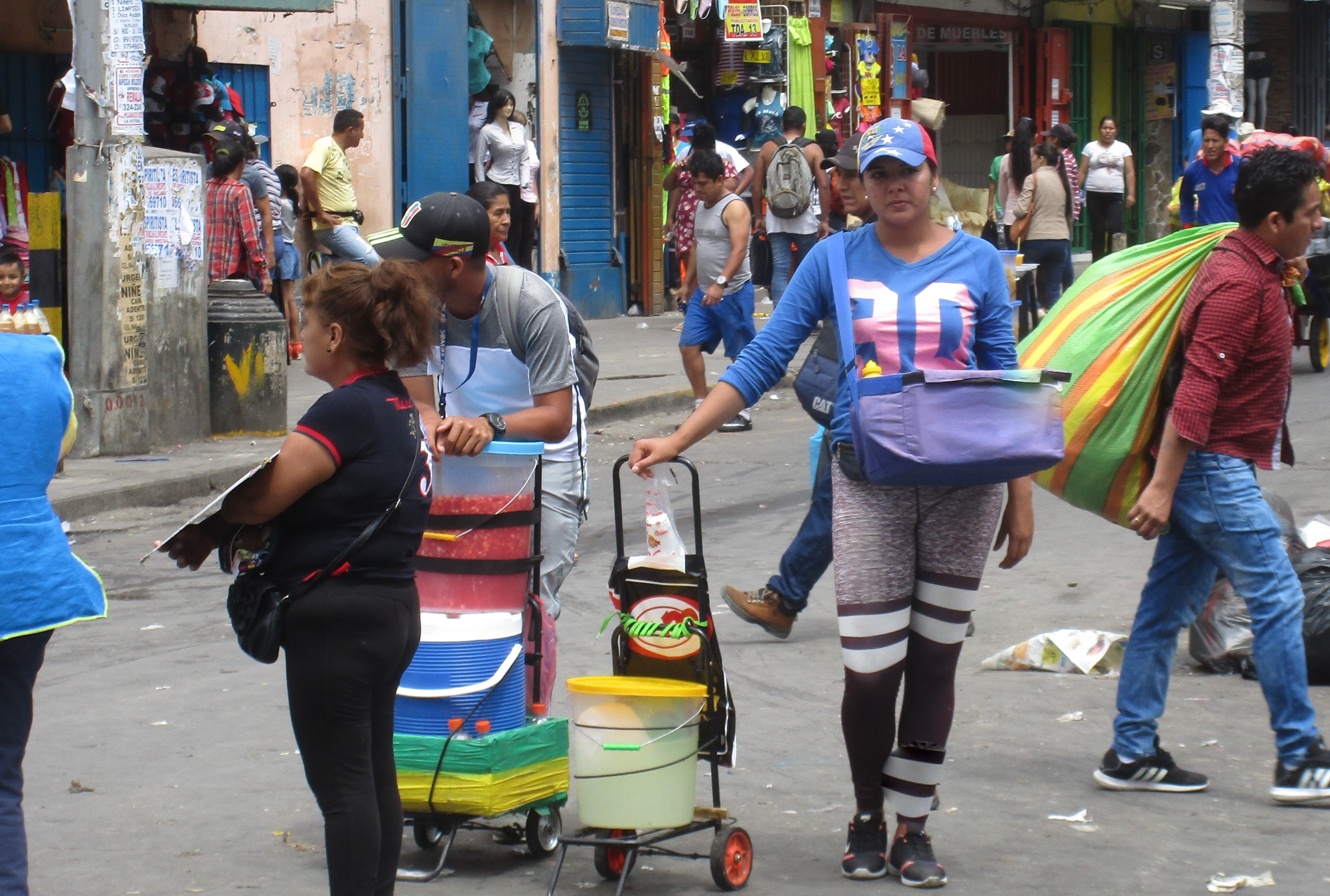
Venezuelans selling arepas and tisana in Lima (2017)

Compared to other destination countries, The New York Times described Peru as being more welcoming to Venezuelan refugees.

Peruvian President Pedro Pablo Kuczynski introduced legislation in 2017 granting existing Venezuelan nationals in Peru a Temporary Permit of Permanence (PTP). The Inter-American Commission on Human Rights approved, encouraging other Latin American countries to adopt similar measures. The Venezuelan Union in Peru, a non-governmental organization, announced that they would present President Kuczynski's actions to the Norwegian Nobel Committee and nominate him for the Nobel Peace Prize:

[W]hile other countries build walls, in Peru, bridges are built to bring citizens closer and protect their most elementary fundamental rights, so with overwhelming hope we will present this nomination of President Pedro Pablo Kuczynski, not only in search of this award, but also to place in the international debate the abuses of which Latin American migrants are victims in some parts of the world.

In August 2017, a little over three months after the decree, over 40,000 Venezuelan refugees had entered Peru. By mid-2018, over 400,000 Venezuelans had emigrated to Peru. In a United Nations survey, 61.9 percent of Venezuelans who moved to Peru worked in retail, tourism or a similar position; 9.4 percent worked in industry and construction. Forty-six percent earned between 984 and 1,968 soles ($300–600) per month; 34 percent earned between 656 and 984 soles ($200–300), and 11 percent earned less than 656 soles per month (less than $200). By the end of 2018 more than 670,000 Venezuelans had emigrated to Peru.

In June 2019, Peruvian President Martín Vizcarra announced that Peru would only accept Venezuelans with passports and visas following June 15, 2019. In the week before the deadline, about 50,000 Venezuelans scrambled to enter Peru while they had the opportunity. In August 2019, the government announced that it will take stricter measures to boost up security at its border with Ecuador to prevent illegal immigration after previous measures showed 90% drop in legal crossings.

In November 2025, Peruvian President José Jerí declared a state of emergency along the southern border with Chile to block an influx of undocumented migrants, primarily Venezuelans. Large numbers of Venezuelans attempted to leave Chile and enter Peru following threats of mass expulsion from Chilean President-elect José Antonio Kast.

==== Trinidad and Tobago ====
It is estimated that there are over 70,000 Venezuelan citizens residing in Trinidad and Tobago, whilst 16,523 have officially regularised their immigration status. Venezuelans have historically emigrated, both legally and illegally, to Trinidad and Tobago due to the country's relatively-stable economy, access to United States dollars, and close proximity to eastern Venezuela. There are legal transport routes both by air and sea: direct flights to the islands leave from the Venezuelan cities of Maturin, Caracas and Isla Margarita, and there is ferry service from the Venezuelan town Guiria and the city of Chaguaramas on Trinidad, or from the Venezuelan town of Tucupita to Trinidad's Cedros. Illegal routes also exist between Venezuela's east coast and the Gulf of Paria. About 14,000 Venezuelans entered Trinidad and Tobago between January 1 and May 10, 2016, with 43 percent reportedly overstaying their visas. Venezuelans who remain often seek employment on the island.

After being rejected and returned to the open sea on December 13, 2020, Venezuelan rafters fleeing the economic crisis shipwrecked in the maritime border when they were returning from Trinidad and Tobago to Sucre state, Venezuela. At least 32 Venezuelans of the 33 that drowned were identified, four of which were minors. Juan Guaidó declared three days of national mourning. In April 2021, another boat with 29 people shipwrecked during a trip to Trinidad and Tobago; 12 people were rescued, 10 died and 7 were declared missing. On February 5, 2022, the Trinidad and Tobago coast guard fired upon a vessel with Venezuelan migrants while attempting to stop it, killing a nine-month-old baby and injuring his mother. The coast guard claimed that the shots were fired "in self-defense". Guaidó stated that "the shots fired by the Trinidad and Tobago Coast Guard have no justification, they killed him", demanding justice. The Prime Minister of Trinidad and Tobago, Keith Rowley, deemed the action "legal and appropriate".

=== Europe ===
In February 2018, almost 1,400 Venezuelans flew across the Atlantic Ocean into Europe. Most of these (1,160) sought asylum in Spain. The number was a significant increase from 150 in February 2016, and 985 in February 2017. Cultural and linguistic ties are the main reason why Spain is the most popular destination among European countries for Venezuelan migrants. Venezuelan citizens can travel the Schengen Area countries without a visa.

==== Spain ====
The vast majority of Venezuelan-born people residing in Europe live in Spain and/or have acquired Spanish citizenship, either in Venezuela or in Spain. Between 2015 and 2018 the number of Venezuelan-born residents in Spain increased from 165,893 to 255,071 people. As of 2019, the number of Venezuelans in Spain exceeds 300,000 people, implying a mass arrival in the 2018–2019 period.

==== Hungary ====
Despite its anti-immigration rhetoric following the European migrant crisis, the government of Viktor Orbán has welcomed hundreds of Venezuelan migrants who have proven to have at least one Hungarian ancestor. However, the reception has not been as positive, with several citizens complaining to the police about the presence of black Venezuelans in the surroundings of the spa of Balatonoszod, where immigrants were initially housed.

=== Israel ===
Due to allegations of antisemitism against the government of Venezuela, based in part on its political alignment with foreign actors like Iran, the Palestinian Authority and Ba'athist Syria, and compounded by the ongoing economic crisis, much of Venezuela's Jewish community has taken advantage of Israel's Law of Return to emigrate to Israel and take up residence there. As much as 60% of Venezuela's Jewish population has sought refuge in Israel since Chávez took office in 1999, when there were 22,000 Jews in Venezuela. This number has been dwindling to around 6,000 Jews still left in Venezuela as of 2019. Over 11,000 Venezuelans have emigrated to Israel since the start of the crisis.

== Humanitarian response ==
=== International ===
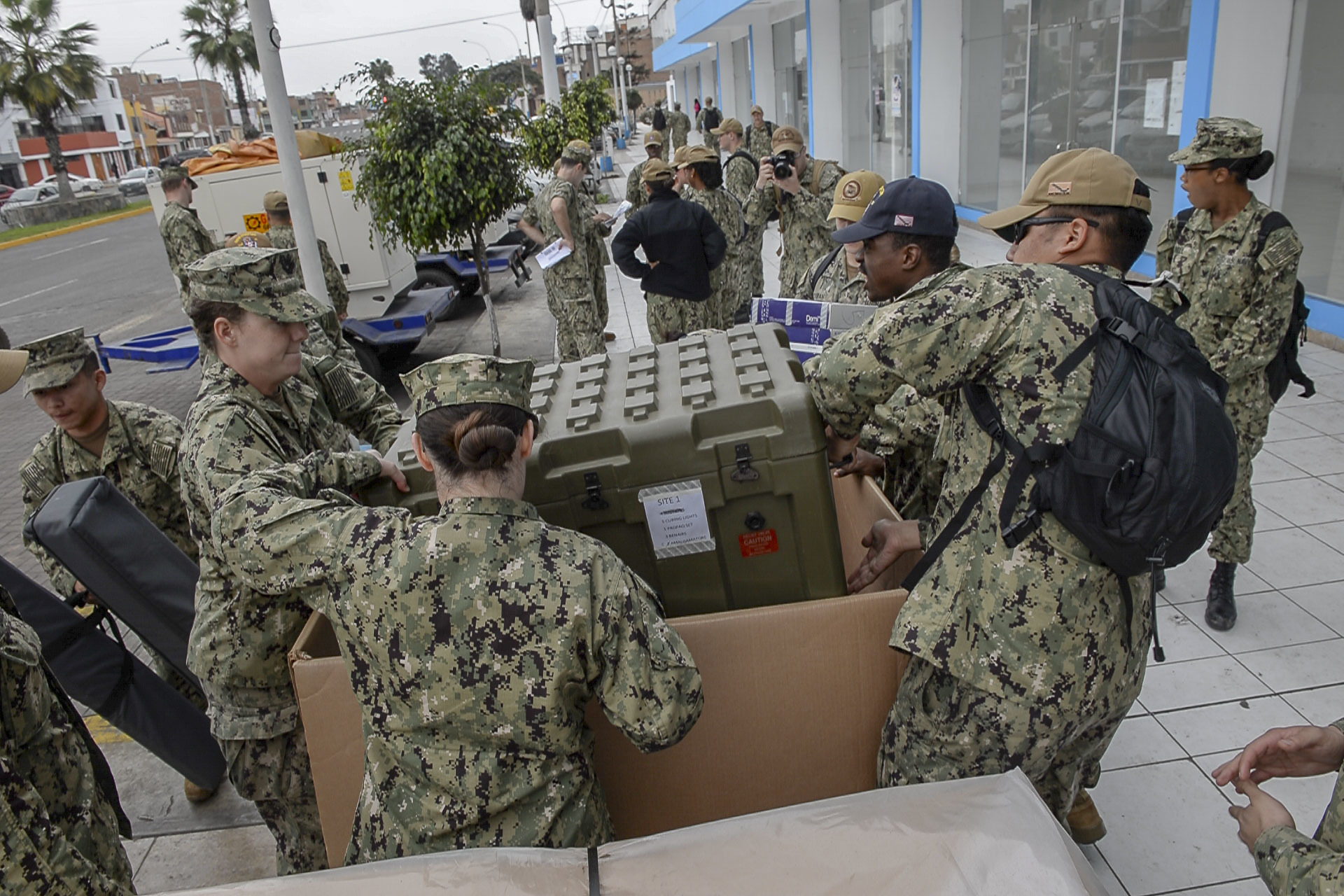
US Navy sailors unload medical supplies in Callao, Peru, to aid medical systems with the increased burden of attending for Venezuelan migrants in 2019.

==== Intergovernmental organizations ====
- European Union – In April 2018, the European Union sent observers to Colombia to assist with planning and accommodating Venezuelan refugees.
- United Nations – In March 2018, the United Nations Refugee Agency urged regional countries to treat Venezuelan migrants as refugees under the Cartagena Declaration on Refugees, and urged countries to accept Venezuelan nationals, grant them access to basic human rights, and not deport Venezuelans who enter their territories. On April 6, 2018, the United Nations World Food Programme declared the situation of Venezuelan immigrants in Colombia a Level 2 Emergency and called for a regional response to the crisis. In October 2018, following the visit of United Nations High Commissioner for Refugees Filippo Grandi to the border area of Colombia and Venezuela, Grandi stated that the refugee crisis was "monumental". On May 6, 2020, UN experts urged Venezuelan government to take some concrete steps towards the devastating impact on basic Human rights of the country's economic crisis. Experts also addressed the country's collapsing health system, pointing out that many hospitals are struggling to care for patients with no reliable electricity or even running water.

The International Donors' Conference in Solidarity with Venezuelan Refugees and Migrants reunited 46 countries, the World Bank or the Inter-American Development Bank by visio conference on June 17, 2021. They pledged to provide 1.5 billion US dollars, consisting of $954 million in grants and $600 million in loans to help Venezuelan migrants. The government of Venezuela called it a "media farce" and "a crude anti-Venezuelan political propaganda operation". In 2020, the conference gathered 2.79 billion US dollars.

==== Governments ====
- Bolivia - On December 13, 2019, the interim government of Jeanine Áñez announced that they will give refuge to 200 Venezuelans "who have fled their country for reasons of political order, of political persecution promoted by the Nicolás Maduro government."
- Colombia – The Colombian government called for aid from the United Nations and regional partners for the influx of hundreds of thousands of Venezuelan immigrants.
- Costa Rica – Foreign Minister Epsy Campbell reported that the country will maintain its "humanitarian attitude of reception" to Venezuelans, understanding that the political situation in that country is "complex".
- Norway – On April 9, 2018, the government of Norway allocated $1 million to fund humanitarian aid in Colombia for Venezuelan refugees.
- United States – USAID began funding Venezuelan care for refugees in Colombia in March 2018, allocating $2.5 million for humanitarian aid. On April 13, Vice President Mike Pence announced during the 8th Summit of the Americas that the Department of State and USAID would provide $16 million to the United Nations High Commissioner for Refugees for aid to Venezuelan refugees in Brazil and Colombia. On August 17, 2018, United States Secretary of Defense Jim Mattis stated that the USNS Comfort hospital ship had set sail to Colombia to provide medical care for Venezuelan refugees during Operation Enduring Promise. In September 2019, the State Department stated that the United States will give $120 million in humanitarian assistance to help Latin American countries cope with the influx of Venezuelan migrants.

The Venezuelan migrant crisis is unique in the world of humanitarian crisis and because of this, has been slow in receiving international attention and aid. The crisis is not an easily defined refugee crisis, and the UN has defined the flow of emigrants as a mixed flow population. This means that those leaving the country are both general migrants and specifically defined asylum-seekers. For this reason, the UN has created a joint platform between UNHCR and IOM, called the Regional Inter-Agency Coordination Platform, tasked with assisting those emigrating from Venezuela. UNHCR has issued a call to apply the wider definition of refugee outlined in the Cartagena Declaration of 1984 to Venezuelan migrants. This would allow this group of individuals to be aided as refugees.

In April 2019, non-governmental organizations Human Rights Watch and the Johns Hopkins Bloomberg School of Public Health to publish a report and asked the United Nations (UN) to define the situation in Venezuela as a complex humanitarian emergency.

The Norwegian Refugee Council, the Brookings Institution and David Smolansky, Organization of American States commissioner for the Venezuelan refugee crisis, have estimated that the crisis is also one of the current most underfunded refugee crises in modern history.

==== Visa restrictions ====
As of January 2021, governments of 10 countries (mostly in Latin America and Caribbean) have introduced special visa requirements for Venezuelan citizens seeking to enter these countries. According to the UN High Commissioner for Human Rights Michelle Bachelet, the introduction of visa requirements could cause Venezuelans in resorting to people-smugglers and human traffickers for illegal entry. Some countries such as Guatemala, Caribbean Netherlands and the Dominican Republic, will still allow Venezuelans to enter visa-free if holding a valid visa/residence permit from a particular third country, such as Canada or the United States.

By 2021, the European Union will introduce an electronic authorization system for Venezuelans planning to visit the Schengen Zone, called ETIAS or European Travel Information and Authorization System. This means that Venezuelans wanting to visit the Schengen Area countries will require to submit personal data in advance and pay a processing fee, except for children. In March 2020, the Spanish government ruled out on imposing visa requirements on Venezuelans seeking to enter Spain or the Schengen Area.

Country	Visa restrictions introduced	Exemptions	Notes
Panama	October 1, 2017	Visa-exempt for holders of a valid visa issued by USA, Australia, Canada, or United Kingdom that has been used at least one time to enter these countries. Transit visa not required if connection time is under 12 hours.	In October 2018, the Panamanian government announced that it will grant Venezuelans a multiple-entry visa for a period of 5 years. From December 2019, it will also accept expired passports for entering the country.
Honduras	November 20, 2017	No exemptions	
Guatemala	March 19, 2018	Visa-exempt for holders of a valid visa issued by Canada, United States, or a Schengen member state.	
Saint Lucia	July 19, 2018	No exemptions	
Peru	June 15, 2019	Visa-exempt for residence permit holders of the Pacific Alliance countries.	Venezuelans can apply for special humanitarian visas at the Peruvian embassies consulates based in Venezuela (Caracas and Ciudad Guayana), Colombia (Bogotá, Medellín, and Leticia), and Ecuador (Cuenca, Guayaquil, Quito, Machala, and Loja). It also accepts expired passports for entry into the country.
Trinidad and Tobago	June 17, 2019	No exemptions	
Chile	June 22, 2019	Visa-exempt for holders of official and diplomatic passports.	The Chilean Foreign Ministry is offering Venezuelans a "democratic responsibility visa", which allows them to stay in Chile for one year and can be extended for an additional 12 months. The visa can be applied at Chilean embassy in Caracas and worldwide. Chile also accepts expired passports for entry into the country.
Ecuador	August 25, 2019	No exemptions	The Ecuadorian government is offering Venezuelans special visas (including humanitarian and temporary permits) to enter the country. It also accepts expired passports for entry into the country.
Dominican Republic	December 16, 2019	Visa-exempt for holders of a valid visa issued by Canada, United States, or a Schengen member state. Also applies to holders of official and diplomatic passports.	
Caribbean Netherlands	January 15, 2021	Visa-exempt for holders of a valid visa or residence permit issued by Canada, United States, Ireland, United Kingdom, or a Schengen member state, including French overseas departments and overseas collectivities.	The visa restrictions are temporary due to the current situation in Venezuela. The visa-free entry will be reintroduced once the situation improves.
Mexico	January 21, 2022	Visa-exempt for residence permit holders of the Pacific Alliance countries.	
Costa Rica	February 21, 2022	No exemptions	

==== Catholic Church ====
The Catholic Church in Peru organized programs to help Venezuelan refugees, dedicating masses and collections to the migrants. The Catholic aid group, Caritas, has provided continuous aid to Venezuelans in need. Since 2018, Caritas has had a permanent base in Venezuela working to combat chronic malnutrition. Further, the Church has funded La Soledad, a shelter based in Mexico City that provides refugees access to food, medical assistance, legal advice, and a safe place to rest.

==== Quito Declaration ====
The Quito Declaration on Human Mobility and Venezuelan Citizens in the Region was signed in the Ecuadorian capital on September 4, 2018, by the representatives of Argentina, Brazil, Chile, Colombia, Costa Rica, Ecuador, Mexico, Panama, Paraguay, Peru and Uruguay. Bolivia and the Dominican Republic did not sign the document. The last nation argued that it was an observer country in the meeting that Venezuela decided not to attend.

The event sought to exchange information and achieve a coordinated response to the massive migratory flow of Venezuelans. At the meeting, the countries reiterated their concern about the deterioration of the internal situation caused by mass migration, so they call to accept the opening of humanitarian assistance in which the cooperation of governments and international organizations is agreed to decompress what they consider a critical situation.

Among the most important points agreed by the governments of the region are the acceptance of expired travel documents, identity card of the Venezuelans for migratory purposes and the exhortation to the government of Nicolás Maduro to take urgently and as a priority the necessary measures for the timely provision of identity cards, passports, birth certificates, marriage certificates and criminal records, as well as apostille and legalization.

=== Domestic ===
President Nicolás Maduro said that international reports of millions of Venezuelans emigrating are "propaganda", and Venezuelans regret leaving the country because they end up "cleaning toilets in Miami". Angry Venezuelans criticized Maduro, saying that they would rather clean toilets in another country than live in Venezuela. In September 2018, President Maduro said that his countrymen had been victims of a hate campaign, and that in Peru they had only found racism, contempt, economic persecution and slavery.

Venezuelan Vice President Delcy Rodríguez denied her country has a humanitarian and migration crisis, calling it "fake news". She argued that the humanitarian crisis would be "an excuse for the United States to invade Venezuela and deepen the economic war."

President of the National Constituent Assembly and Vice President of the United Socialist Party of Venezuela, Diosdado Cabello, claimed that the migrant crisis is being staged as part of a right-wing conspiracy to overthrow the government of Nicolás Maduro, and that images showing Venezuelans fleeing across South America on foot had been manufactured.

==== Back to the homeland plan ====
In 2018, the Bolivarian government introduced the "Back to the homeland plan" (Spanish: Plan Vuelta a la Patria) that offers the payment of tickets to Venezuelan migrants who want to return to their country. On August 28, 2018, 89 Venezuelans returned to Venezuela from Peru. The program was implemented in Peru and other in other South American countries such as Ecuador and Chile. However, the program has achieved very little for the return of their fellow citizens.

== See also ==
- Crisis in Venezuela (2012–present)
- Venezuelan protests (2014–present)
- Quito Process
- Refugees of the Syrian Civil War
- European migrant crisis
- List of diasporas
- Visa requirements for Venezuelan citizens
- List of incidents of xenophobia during the Venezuelan refugee crisis
- List of largest refugee crises
- Emigration from Colombia (during the Colombian conflict)
- Venezuelans
- Exilio venezolano
