= Venezuelan diaspora =

Venezuelans living outside Venezuela

Diáspora venezolana
- World map of the Venezuelan diaspora

Total population
- 8 - 9 million (est.)

Regions with significant populations
- Colombia: 2,875,743
- Peru: 1,542,004
- Chile: 728,586
- Spain: 692,316
- Brazil: 626,885
- Ecuador: 474,945
- United States: 259,000–500,000
- Argentina: 220,000
- Italy: 150,000
- Portugal: 100,000
- Mexico: 95,000
- Dominican Republic: 90,000
- Panama: 80,000
- Trinidad and Tobago: 36,000
- Canada: 34,000
- France: 30,000
- Costa Rica: 25,000
- Germany: 20,000
- Paraguay: 20,000
- Curaçao: 16,000
- Other destinations: United Kingdom 15,000; Cuba 15,000; Vietnam 12,000; Lebanon 12,000; Uruguay 12,000; Australia 10,000; Haiti 5,198; Guyana 5,123; Guatemala 5,000; Ireland 5,000; Bolivia 4,000; Switzerland 4,000; Netherlands 3,900; Aruba 3,400; United Arab Emirates 2,500; New Zealand 2,000; Sweden 1,837; Norway 1,607; Greece 1,026; Japan 1,000; Saudi Arabia 1,000; Austria 915; Denmark 1400; El Salvador 700; Belgium 570; Israel 373; Botswana 305; Honduras 200

Languages
- Venezuelan Spanish

Religion
- Christianity (Roman Catholicism)

Related ethnic groups
- Brazilian diaspora, Mexican diaspora
- Emigration is caused by social issues, political repression, crime, economic downturn, corruption, censorship and others.

The Venezuelan diaspora is estimated to be as high as 8 to 9 million people as of late 2025, out of a country of about 32 million. It is the largest South American diaspora in the world.

In times of economic and political crisis since the 2010s, Venezuelans have often immigrated to other countries in the Americas and beyond to establish a more sustainable life.

== History ==
=== 19th century ===
In 1827, a group of Jews moved from Curaçao and settled in Coro, Venezuela. In 1855, rioting in the area forced the entire Jewish population, 168 individuals, back to Curaçao. Assimilation of Jews in Venezuela was difficult, though small communities could be found in Puerto Cabello, Villa de Cura, Carupano, Rio Chico, Maracaibo, and Barquisimeto.

=== 20th century ===
During World War II, the Venezuelan government broke relations with the Axis powers in 1942, with many groups consisting of hundreds of German-Venezuelans leaving Venezuela to be repatriated into Nazi Germany.

In the early 1980s, the Venezuelan government had invested much into the country's infrastructure and communications, though by the mid-1980s when Venezuela faced economic difficulties and inequality increased, some Venezuelans emigrated. Again, at the peak of Venezuela's socioeconomic difficulties in the late 1990s, Venezuelans began to emigrate once more, with some attempting to enter the United States legally and illegally.

=== 21st century ===
==== Venezuelan refugee crisis ====
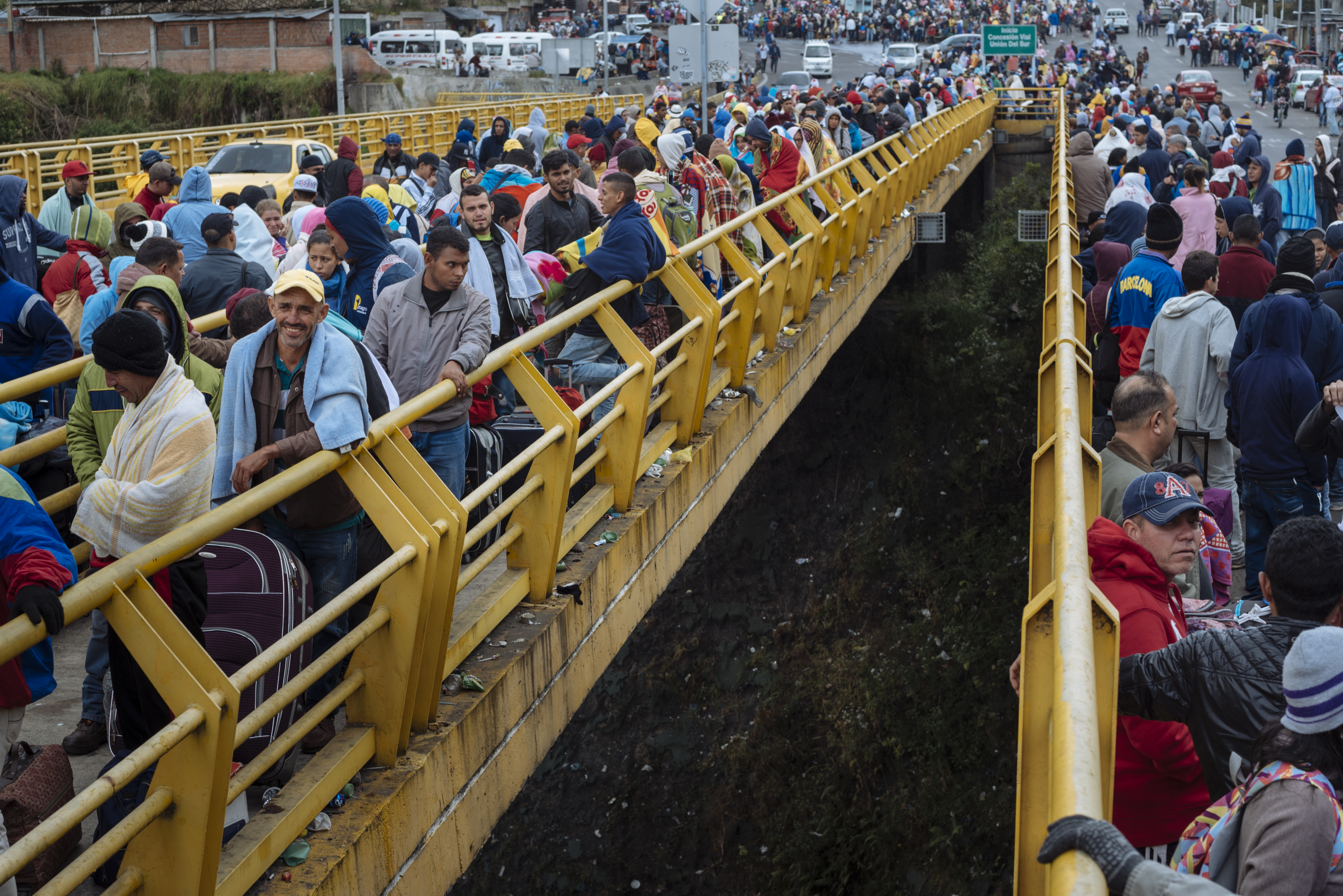
Venezuelan refugees in 2018

During the Bolivarian Revolution, many Venezuelans have sought residence in other countries. According to Newsweek, the "Bolivarian diaspora is a reversal of fortune on a massive scale" as compared to the 20th century, when "Venezuela was a haven for immigrants fleeing Old World repression and intolerance". El Universal explained how the "Bolivarian diaspora" in Venezuela has been caused by the "deterioration of both the economy and the social fabric, rampant crime, uncertainty and lack of hope for a change in leadership in the near future".

In 1998, the year Chavez was first elected, only 14 Venezuelans were granted U.S. asylum. By September 1999, 1,086 Venezuelans were granted asylum according to the U.S. Citizenship and Immigration Services. It has been calculated that from 1998 to 2013, over 1.5 million Venezuelans (between 4% and 6% of the Venezuela's total population) left the country following the Bolivarian Revolution. Former Venezuelan residents have been driven by lack of freedom, high levels of insecurity, and inadequate opportunities in the country, risking their lives sometimes walking the Darien Gap. It has also been reported that some parents in Venezuela encourage their children to leave the country because of the insecurities Venezuelans face. This has led to significant human capital flight in Venezuela.

Testimony of a Venezuelan immigrant about her first days in São Paulo, March 2017 (in Spanish, with English subtitles)

By late 2025, the UNHCR reported that approximately 7.9 million Venezuelan refugees and migrants were residing worldwide, with the majority in Latin America.

===== Brazil's Operation Welcome =====
In 2018, the Brazilian Army launched Operation Welcome to help Venezuelan immigrants arriving in the state of Roraima, which borders Venezuela.

== See also ==
- Venezuelan refugee crisis
- List of diasporas
- Venezuelans
