= MeQuieroIr.com =

- Available in: Spanish
- Owner: Esther Bermúdez
- Editor: Annie Bernal
- Website: www.mequieroir.com
- Launched: 2001
- Current status: Active

MeQuieroIr.com is a website focusing on emigration services for Spanish-speaking individuals. The site provides free information in Spanish about immigration requirements and how to start life in Europe, North America and Oceania and focuses on work-study opportunities.

== History ==
After working as a public affairs worker for PDVSA between 1994 and 2001, Esther Bermudez, emigrated to Montreal, Canada and created MeQuieroIr.com as a private project that was developed based on research, analysis and interpretation of various sources of knowledge.

Following the 2006 Venezuelan presidential elections and the re-election of Chávez, visits to emigration websites by Venezuelans dramatically increased, with visits to MeQuieroIr.com increasing from 20,000 users in December 2006 to 30,000 users in January 2007. After another re-election of Chávez following the 2012 Venezuelan presidential election, website visits to MeQuieroIr.com tripled to 180,000.

In January 2014, MeQuieroIr.com reported record website traffic, double of what they usually experienced. Months later in September and October 2014, website visits were 180,000 and 200,000, much higher than the monthly average of 60,000 between 2010 and 2014, with director Esther Bermudez stating that the page views were "the highest and most prolonged traffic spike we have experienced since we launched in 2001".

== Demographics ==
Users of MeQuieroIr.com are primarily from Venezuela, Colombia, Argentina, Peru, Mexico and Spain. The majority of the website's visitors are from Venezuela (64.2%), followed by Chile, Argentina, Mexico and Spain. The main users of the site are between ages 21 and 45 and are middle-class professionals.

The service's popularity has grown very quickly in Venezuela, due to the large number of people hoping to escape the problems in that country.

== See also ==
- Venezuelan diaspora
