= Operação Acolhida =

Brazilian Operation Launchpad

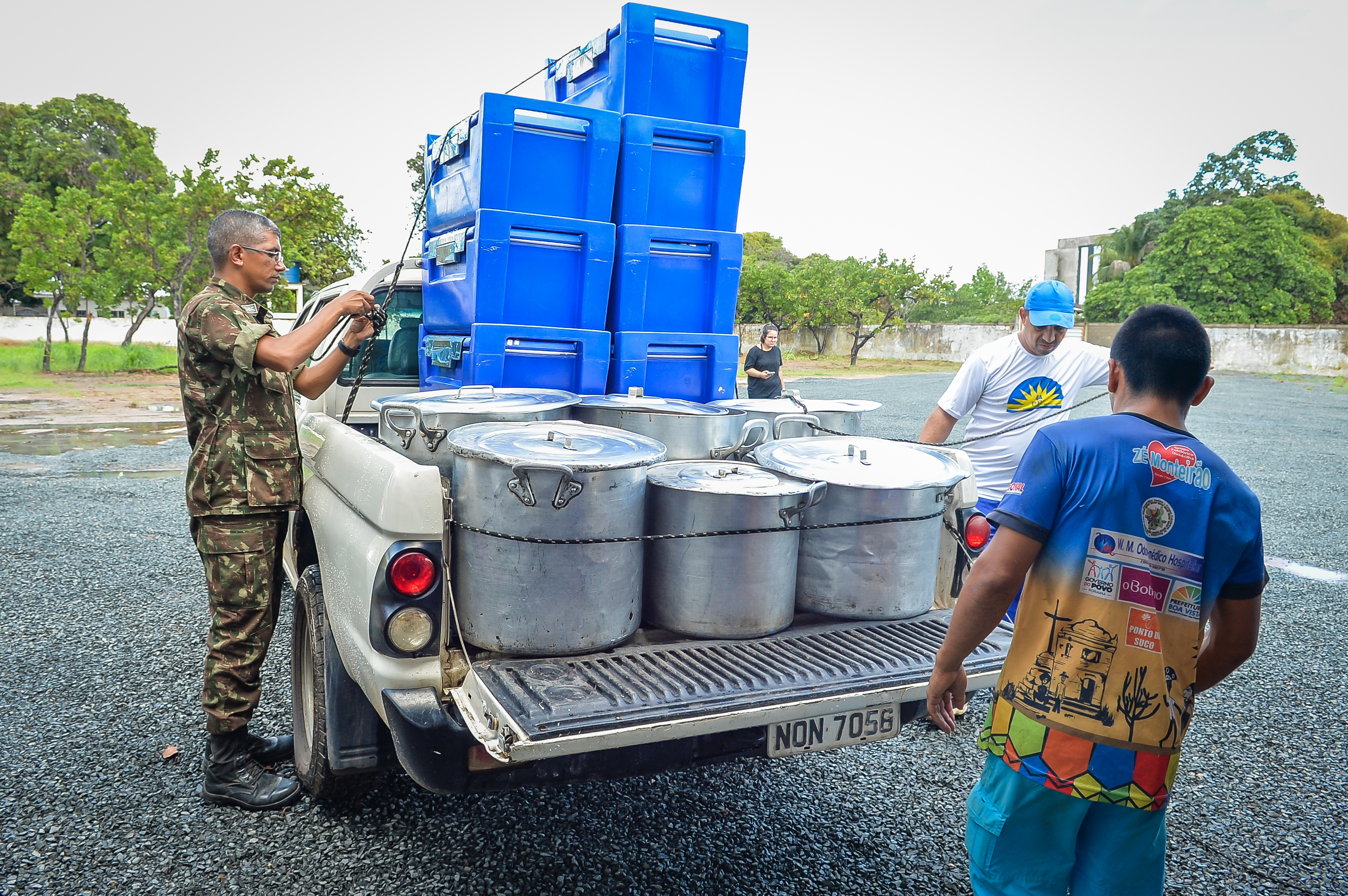
Food and drink for the Venezuelan refugees.

Operação Acolhida (en: Operation Welcome) is a Brazilian operation launched by the Brazilian Army in February 2018 that aims to protect Venezuelans crossing the border, providing humanitarian aid to Venezuelan immigrants in vulnerable situations, refugees from the political, institutional and socioeconomic crisis that affects the people of Venezuela under dictator Nicolás Maduro (2013-2026).

It began under president Michel Temer (May 2016 - Dec. 31, 2018) and continued under president Jair Bolsonaro (Jan. 1, 2019 - Dec. 31, 2022) and under president Lula da Silva (Jan. 1, 2023 - today).
