= Venezuelan passport =

Passport issued to Venezuelan citizens

Venezuelan passport; Pasaporte venezolano
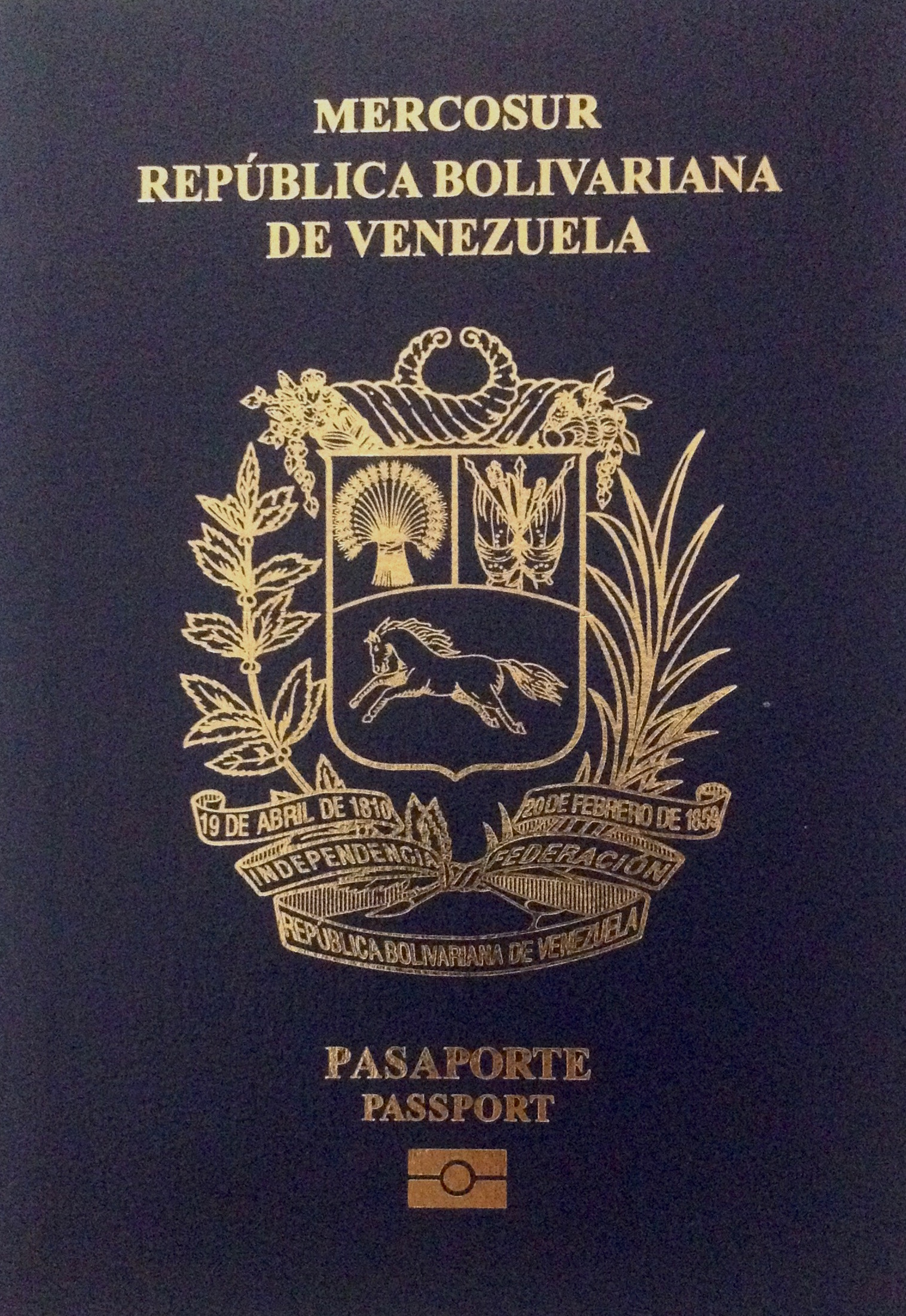
- The current front cover of the Venezuelan biometric passport.
- Type: Passport
- Issued by: Venezuela
- First issued: 1 July 2007 (first biometric version); 17 April 2015 (second biometric version)
- Purpose: Identification
- Eligibility: Venezuelan citizenship
- Expiration: 10 years for over 18. 5 years between ages 17 and 4. 3 years between ages 3 to 0.

Venezuelan passport (Spanish: Pasaporte venezolano) are issued to citizens of Venezuela to travel outside the country. Biometric passports have been issued since July 2007, with a RFID chip containing a picture and fingerprints; passports issued earlier remained valid until they expired.

As of 2015, passports were 34 pages long and displayed a biometric symbol on the bottom of the cover. The cover is deep blue and shows the name Mercosur followed by "República Bolivariana de Venezuela" on the top.

The holder's personal information is written in a digital format on a plastic card which also bears a machine-readable zone on the bottom, and a picture of the holder on the left.

Starting from 19 April 2021, all new passports for adults will cost the equivalent of US$216 (at the exchange rate published by the Central Bank of Venezuela) valid for 10 years. For Children aged 3 and 17 US$162. And for babies aged at least three months and under 3 years US$108.

Due to the difficulty to obtain a new passport in Venezuela, the United States, Canada, Spain and several Latin American countries accept the use expired Venezuelan passports up to five years.

== History ==
=== Fraud investigation ===
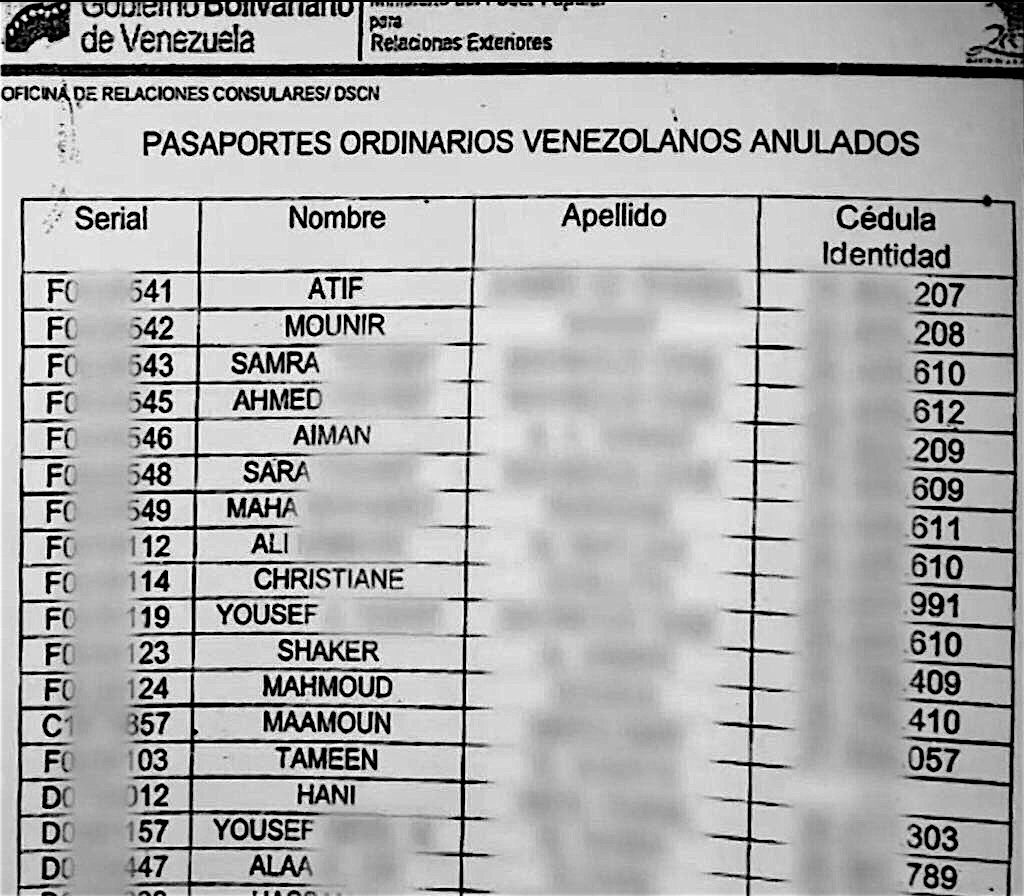
A portion of a document showing the twenty-one individuals from the Middle East who were issued Venezuelan passports after making a payment at the Venezuelan embassy in Iraq.

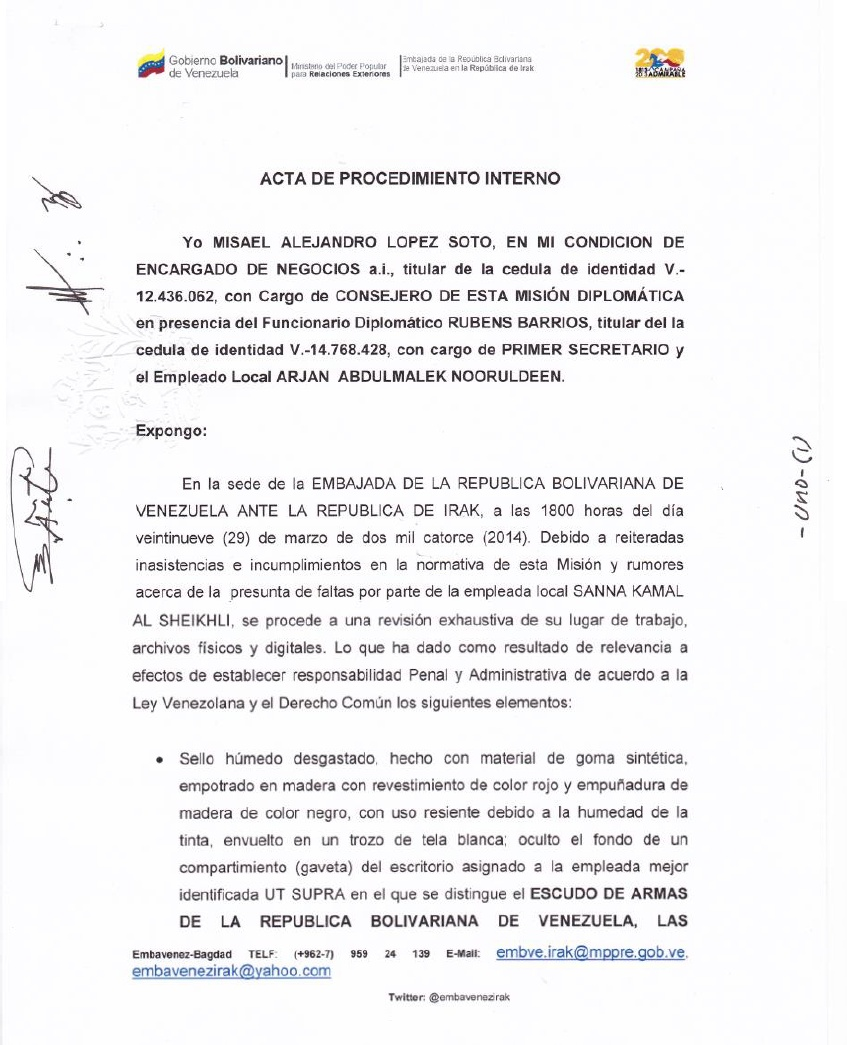
Part of a document sent by Misael López Soto to his superiors regarding irregularities at the Venezuelan embassy in Iraq.

On 8 February 2017, a joint CNN and CNN en Español investigation called "Passports in the Shadows" (Spanish: Pasaportes en la sombra) - based on the information provided by a whistleblower and subsequent investigations, reported that employees of the Venezuelan embassy in Baghdad, Iraq has been selling passports and visas to persons from Middle Eastern countries (specifically Syria, Palestine, Iran, Iraq and Pakistan) with dubious backgrounds for profits, including to members of the Lebanese group Hezbollah.

The Venezuelan immigration department, SAIME, confirmed the sold passports' genuineness as each passport came with an assigned national identification number, although the names of these individuals were altered when checking against the national database. At least one individual's place of birth was also changed from Iraq to Venezuela. According to Misael López Soto, a former employee at the Venezuelan embassy in Iraq who was also a lawyer and CICPC officer, the Bolivarian government would sell authentic passports to individuals from the Middle East, with the Venezuelan passport able to access 130 countries throughout the world without a visa requirement. López provided CNN documents showing how his superiors attempted to cover up the sale of passports, which were being sold from $5,000 to $15,000 per passport. López Soto fled the Venezuelan embassy in Iraq in 2015 to meet with the FBI in Spain, with a Venezuelan official who assisted him to fly out of the country being killed the same day. The investigation also found that between 2008 and 2012, Tareck El Aissami ordered for hundreds of Middle Eastern individuals to obtain illegal passports, including members of Hezbollah.

The Venezuelan foreign minister, Delcy Rodríguez, denied the government's involvement when questioned by the reporters during the Seventy-first session of the United Nations General Assembly and accused the network of performing what she described as an "imperialistic media operation" against Venezuela for airing the year-long fraud investigation.

On 14 February 2017, Venezuelan authorities ceased the broadcasting of CNN en Español two days after the Venezuelan president, Nicolás Maduro, ordered CNN to "(get) well away from here". The government deemed the report "(A threat to) the peace and democratic stability of our Venezuelan people since they generate an environment of intolerance." Venezuelan National Commission of Telecommunications director Andrés Eloy Méndez accused CNN en Español of instigating religious, racial and political hatred, violence and other themes.

=== Material shortages ===
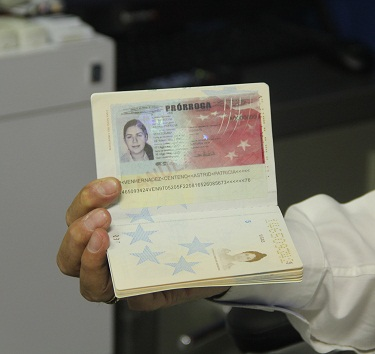
Extension stamped on a Venezuelan passport

In March 2017, it was reported that SAIME lacks enough "materials" to cope with demands for passports. As a result, only approximately 300,000 passports were issued in 2016 while between 1.8 million and 3 million Venezuelans applied for passports. SAIME launched an online platform for applications while guaranteeing 72-hour delivery with doubled fees. The site has crashed numerous times since its launch. Those outside Venezuela were solicited bribes usually many times of the cost of the passport.

Due to these shortages, the Maduro government has since 1 November 2017 allowed Venezuelan passport holders to extend their passports by 2 years, provided these passports have enough blank pages, although Venezuelan citizens with pending applications for new passports will end up having said applications cancelled if they exercised the former option. Since 2022 the passport extension was granted for up to 5 years passed the expiration date.

== Visa requirements map ==
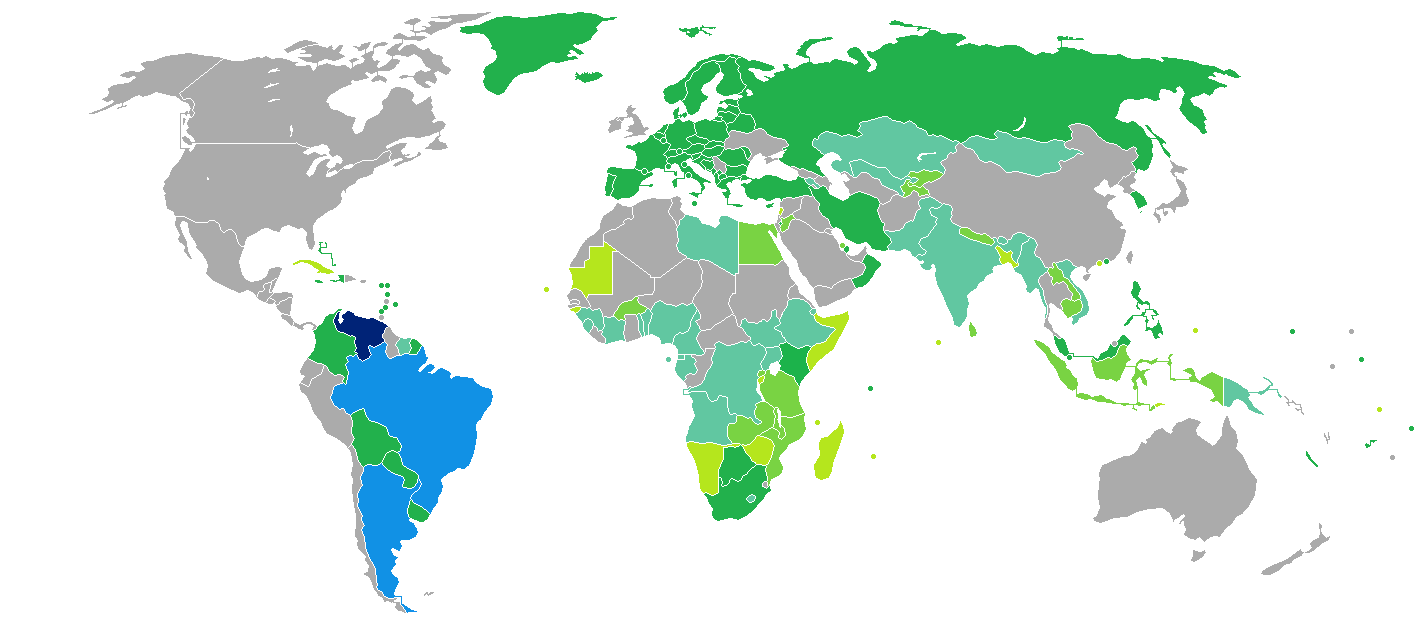
Visa requirements for Venezuelan citizens Venezuela ID card travel Visa free access Visa on arrival eVisa Visa available both on arrival or online Visa required

Visa requirements for Venezuelan citizens are administrative entry restrictions by the authorities of other states placed on citizens of Venezuela. As of 1 May 2022, Venezuelan citizens had visa-free or visa on arrival access to 128 countries and territories, ranking the Venezuelan passport 42nd in the world in terms of travel freedom according to the Henley Passport Index.

Venezuelans do not require a passport when travelling to Argentina and Brazil, as they are allowed to use their ID card (Cédula de Identidad) instead.

=== Recent developments ===
Since 2017, 10 countries in Latin America and Caribbean (Panama, Honduras, Guatemala, Saint Lucia, Peru, Trinidad and Tobago, Chile, Ecuador, Dominican Republic and Caribbean Netherlands) have stopped providing visa-free access to Venezuelans following the ongoing refugee crisis and reinstated visa requirements for those seeking to enter these countries. Some countries will still allow Venezuelans to enter visa-free if holding a valid visa/residence permit from a particular third country, such as Canada or the United States.

From 21 January 2022, Mexico started requiring visa for Venezuelan citizens.

== Gallery ==
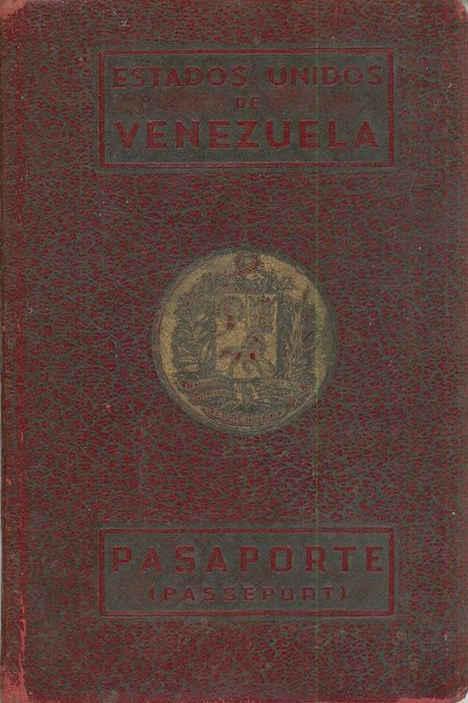
Passport of the United States of Venezuela issued in 1946.

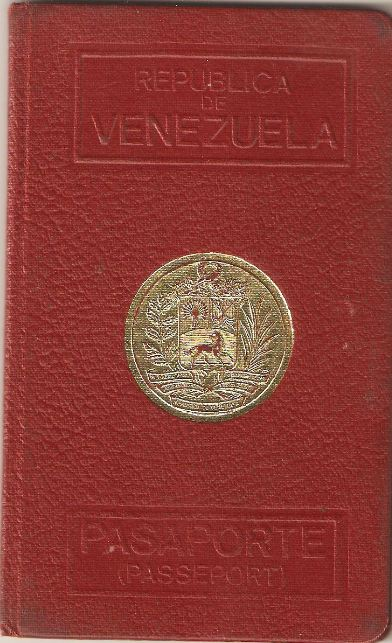
Front cover of a Venezuelan passport issued in 1972.

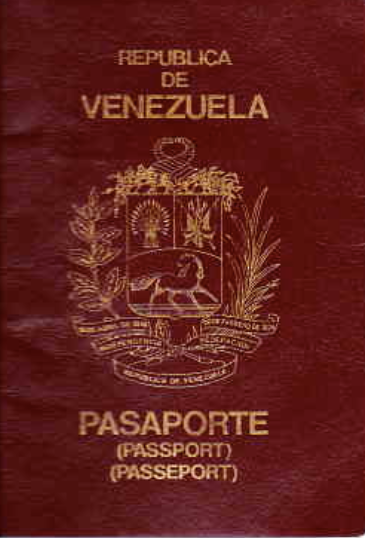
Passport of the Republic of Venezuela, prior to the Bolivarian Republic.

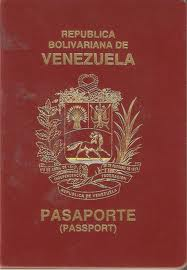
Venezuelan passport prior to that of the Andean community.

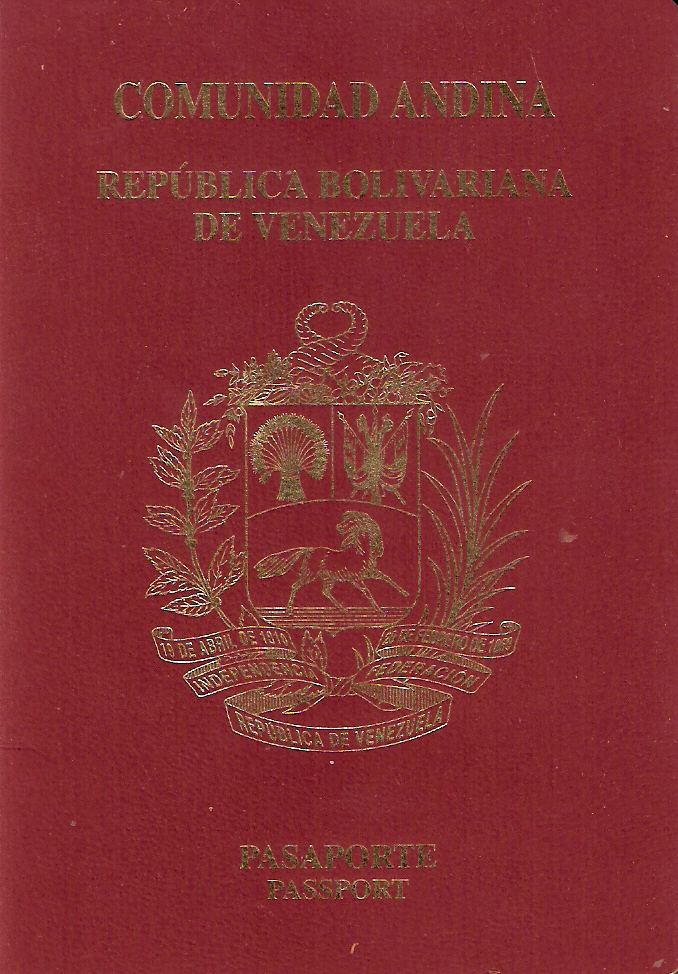
Until 2006, Venezuela issued the Andean Passport.

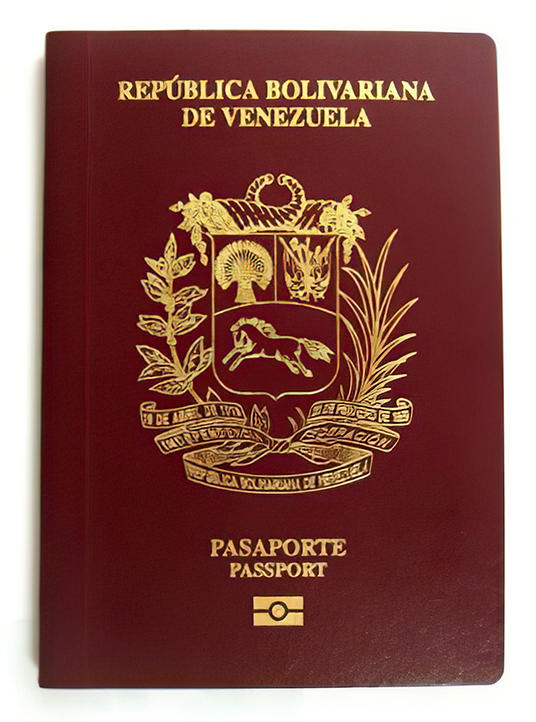
Venezuelan biometric passport issued from 2007 until 2014. It circulates simultaneously with the format implemented since 2015, until its expiration.

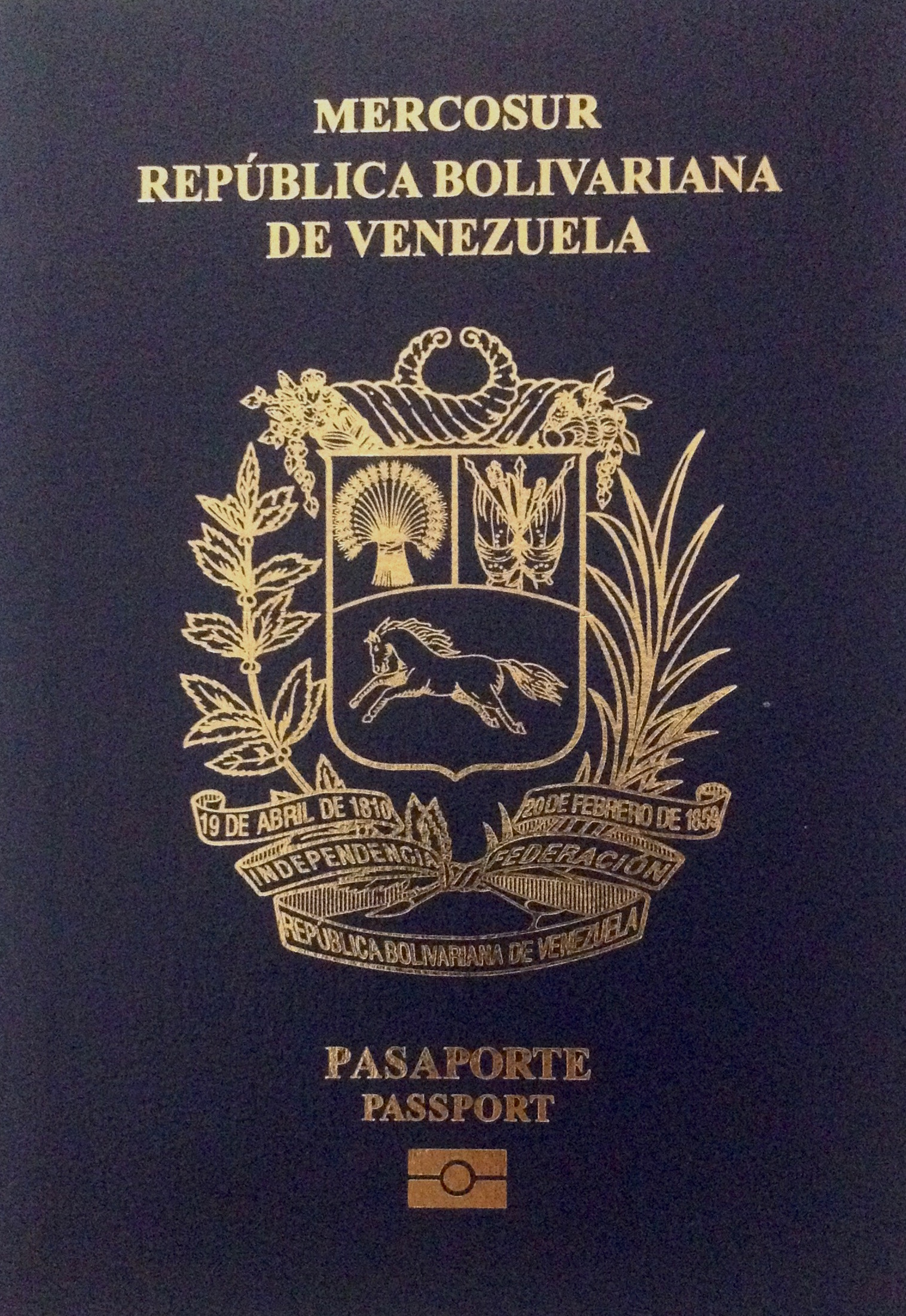
Passport, valid since 2015.

== See also ==
- List of passports
- Venezuelan nationality law
- Visa requirements for Venezuelan citizens
- Visa policy of Venezuela
