= Venezuelan nationality law =

Venezuelan Citizenship Act

Parliament of Venezuela
- Long title: An Act relating to Venezuelan citizenship
- Enacted by: Government of Venezuela
- Status: Current legislation

Venezuelan nationality law is the law governing the acquisition, transmission and loss of Venezuelan citizenship. It is based on the principle of jus soli: any person born in Venezuela acquires Venezuelan citizenship at birth, irrespective of nationality or status of parents. Venezuelan nationality law is regulated by Section 1 of Chapter 2 of the Constitution of Venezuela and by the Nationality and Citizenship Act of 2004.

== Citizenship by birth ==
- A child born in Venezuela regardless of the nationality or status of the parents.
- A child born outside Venezuela to parents who are both Venezuelans by birth.
- A child born outside Venezuela to a Venezuelan father or mother, who is a Venezuelan by birth, provided that the child is living in Venezuela or declares their intention to obtain the Venezuelan nationality at any of the Diplomatic missions of Venezuela.
- A child born outside Venezuela to a naturalized Venezuelan father or mother, provided that the child lives in Venezuela prior to reaching 18 years of age and declares their intention to obtain the Venezuelan nationality at the Ministry of Interior and Justice or at any Venezuelan Public Registry.

== Citizenship by naturalization ==
Applicants must be legally residing in Venezuela, must have passed a citizenship test and meet the continuous residence requirement prior to submitting an application for naturalization to the Venezuelan government:

- Any person who has been legally living in Venezuela for 10 continuous years.
- Natural-born citizens of Spain, Portugal, Italy, Latin American or Caribbean country and have been legally living in Venezuela for 5 continuous years.
- Foreign-born minor children whose parent(s) obtained Venezuelan citizenship by naturalization and have been legally living in Venezuela for 5 continuous years. A nationality declaration must be made by the minor before the age of 21.
- A spouse or husband of a Venezuelan citizen who has been married and living in Venezuela for 5 continuous years.

== Dual citizenship ==
Dual nationality is permitted under Venezuelan law as of Article 34 of the Constitution of Venezuela. According to article 7 of the Nationality and Citizenship Act, Venezuelans with dual nationality must enter and exit Venezuela with their Venezuelan passport.

Venezuelans who possess dual citizenship have the same rights and duties as Venezuelans who do not possess dual citizenship.

== Loss of Venezuelan citizenship ==
- A Venezuelan-born cannot be deprived their nationality.
- Any Venezuelan-born may voluntary renounce their Venezuelan nationality by birth if they obtain a foreign nationality. A declaration must be made at any of the Diplomatic missions of Venezuela if living abroad or at any Venezuelan Public Registry if living in Venezuela and such declaration will take effect if entered into their Venezuelan birth certificate.
- Venezuelan citizens by naturalization may be deprived of their Venezuelan nationality (i.e. treason, fraud or national security grounds) by a court judgment from a Venezuelan Court.
- Venezuelan citizens by naturalization may voluntarily renounce their Venezuelan nationality. A declaration must be made at any of the Diplomatic missions of Venezuela if living abroad or at any Venezuelan Public Registry if living in Venezuela.

== Resumption of Venezuelan citizenship ==
- Former Venezuelan citizens by birth may regain their Venezuelan nationality by birth if they have been legally in Venezuela for 2 years and a declaration of recovery has entered their Venezuelan birth certificate.
- Former Venezuelan citizens by naturalization must meet again the residency requirements as of Article 33 of the Constitution of Venezuela.

== Visa requirements of Venezuelan citizens ==
Visa requirements for Venezuelan citizens are administrative entry restrictions by the authorities of other states placed on citizens of Venezuela. As of 7 July 2020, Venezuelan citizens had visa-free or visa on arrival access to 129 countries and territories, ranking the Venezuelan passport 44th in terms of travel freedom (tied with the Nicaraguan and Ukrainian passport) according to the Henley Passport Index. For traveling within South America (except Paraguay, Uruguay and the Guyanas), Venezuelans do not need to use a passport, as they may use their ID card.

== See also ==
- Constitution of Venezuela
- Venezuelan passport
