= List of diplomatic missions in Venezuela =

This is a list of diplomatic missions in Venezuela. There are currently 56 embassies in Caracas. Several other countries have ambassadors accredited from other regional capitals. This listing excludes honorary consulates.

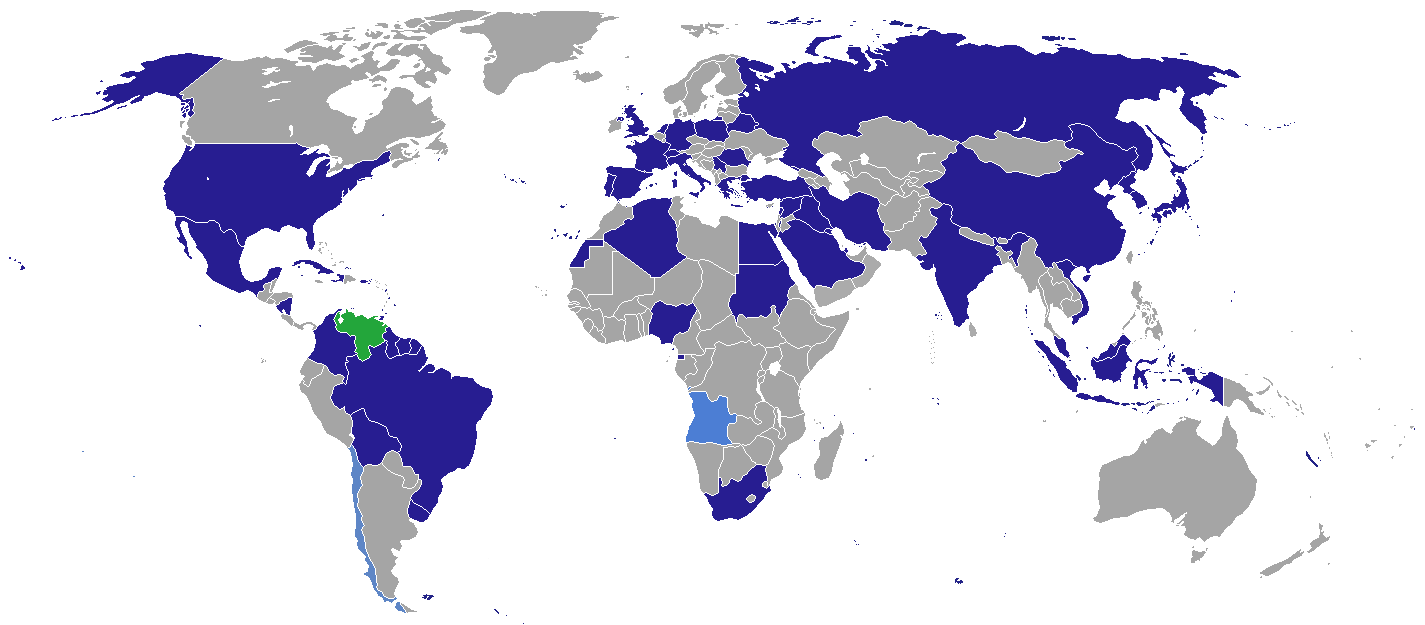
Map of diplomatic missions in Venezuela

== Diplomatic missions in Caracas ==
=== Embassies ===
1. Abkhazia
2. Algeria
3. Barbados
4. Belarus
5. Bolivia
6. Brazil
7. China
8. Colombia
9. Cuba
10. Egypt
11. Equatorial Guinea
12. France
13. Germany
14. Greece
15. Grenada
16. Guyana
17. Haiti
18. Holy See
19. India
20. Indonesia
21. Iran
22. Iraq
23. Italy
24. Japan
25. Kuwait
26. Lebanon
27. Libya
28. Malaysia
29. Mexico
30. Netherlands
31. Nicaragua
32. Nigeria
33. North Korea
34. Palestine
35. Poland
36. Portugal
37. Qatar
38. Romania
39. Russia
40. Sahrawi Republic
41. Saint Vincent and the Grenadines
42. Saudi Arabia
43. Serbia
44. South Africa
45. South Korea
46. Sovereign Military Order of Malta
47. Spain
48. Sudan
49. Suriname
50. Switzerland
51. Syria
52. Trinidad and Tobago
53. Turkey
54. United Kingdom
55. United States
56. Vietnam

=== Other missions or delegations ===
- European Union (Delegation)

=== Gallery ===
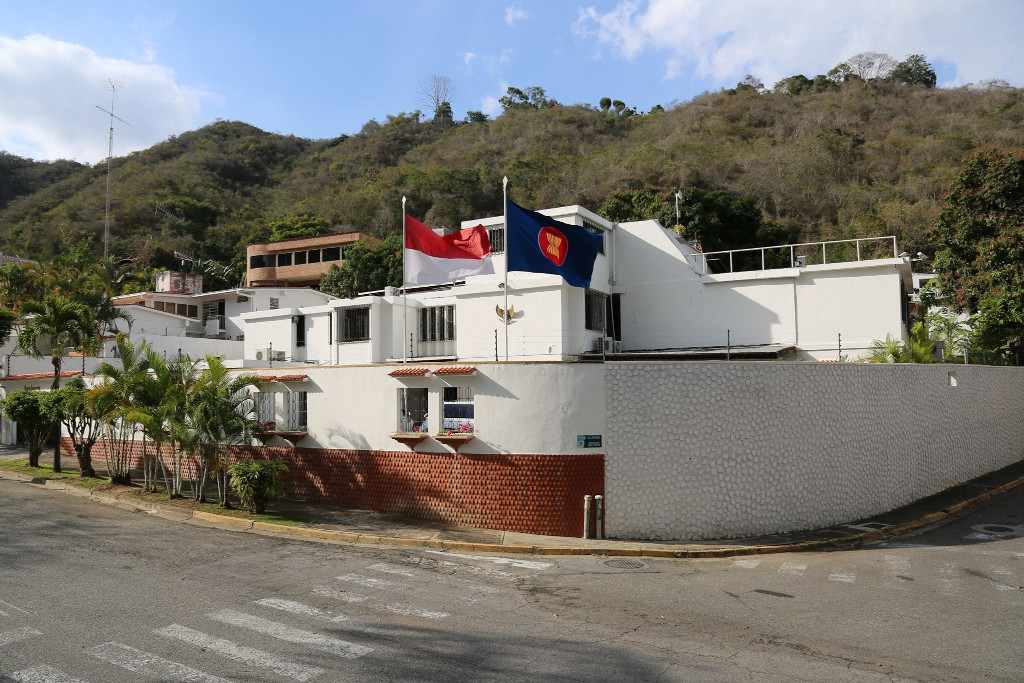
Embassy of Indonesia

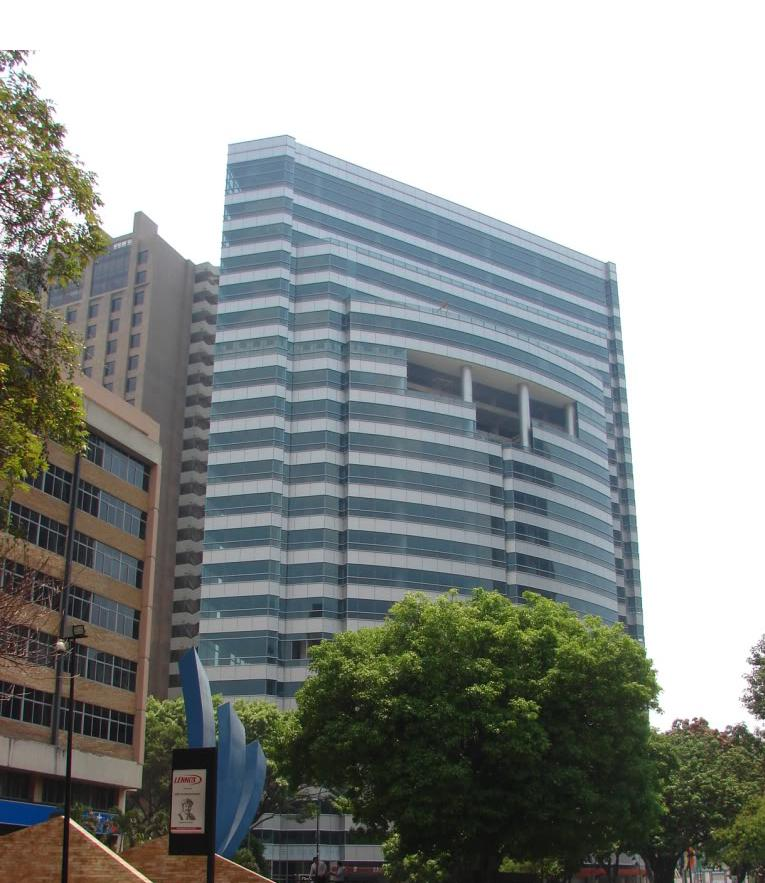
Building hosting the Embassy of Japan

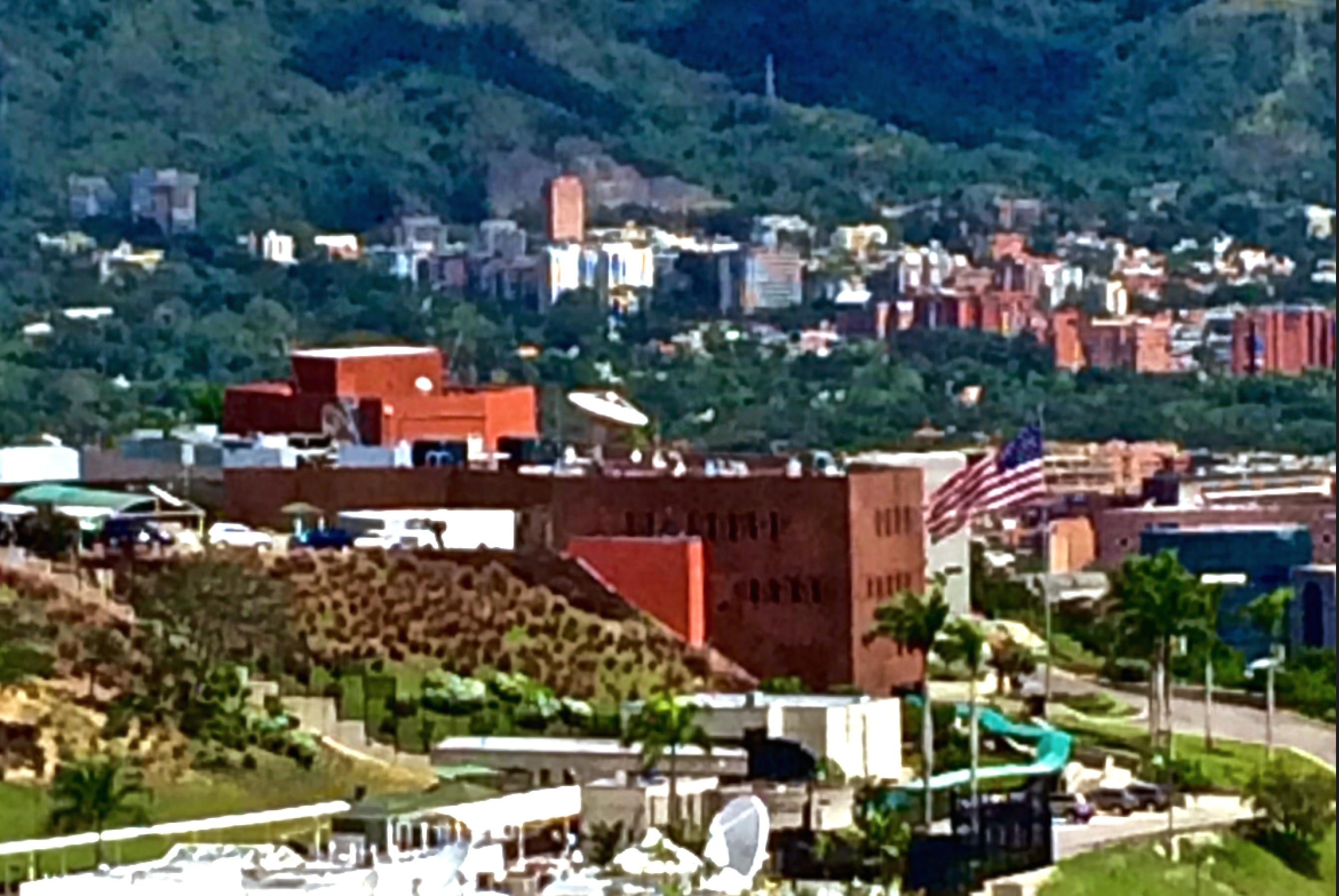
Embassy of the United States

== Consular missions ==
=== Caracas ===
- Angola (Consulate-General)
- Chile (Consulate-General)
- Panama (Consulate)
- Peru (Consulate-General)
- Uruguay (Consular section)

=== Barquisimeto, Lara State ===
- Colombia (Consulate)

=== Maracaibo, Zulia State ===
- Colombia (Consulate-General)
- Italy (Consulate)

=== Puerto La Cruz, Anzoátegui State ===
- Colombia (Consulate-General)

=== Puerto Ordaz, Bolívar State ===
- Chile (Consulate-General)
- Colombia (Consulate)

=== San Antonio del Táchira, Táchira State ===
- Colombia (Consulate-General)
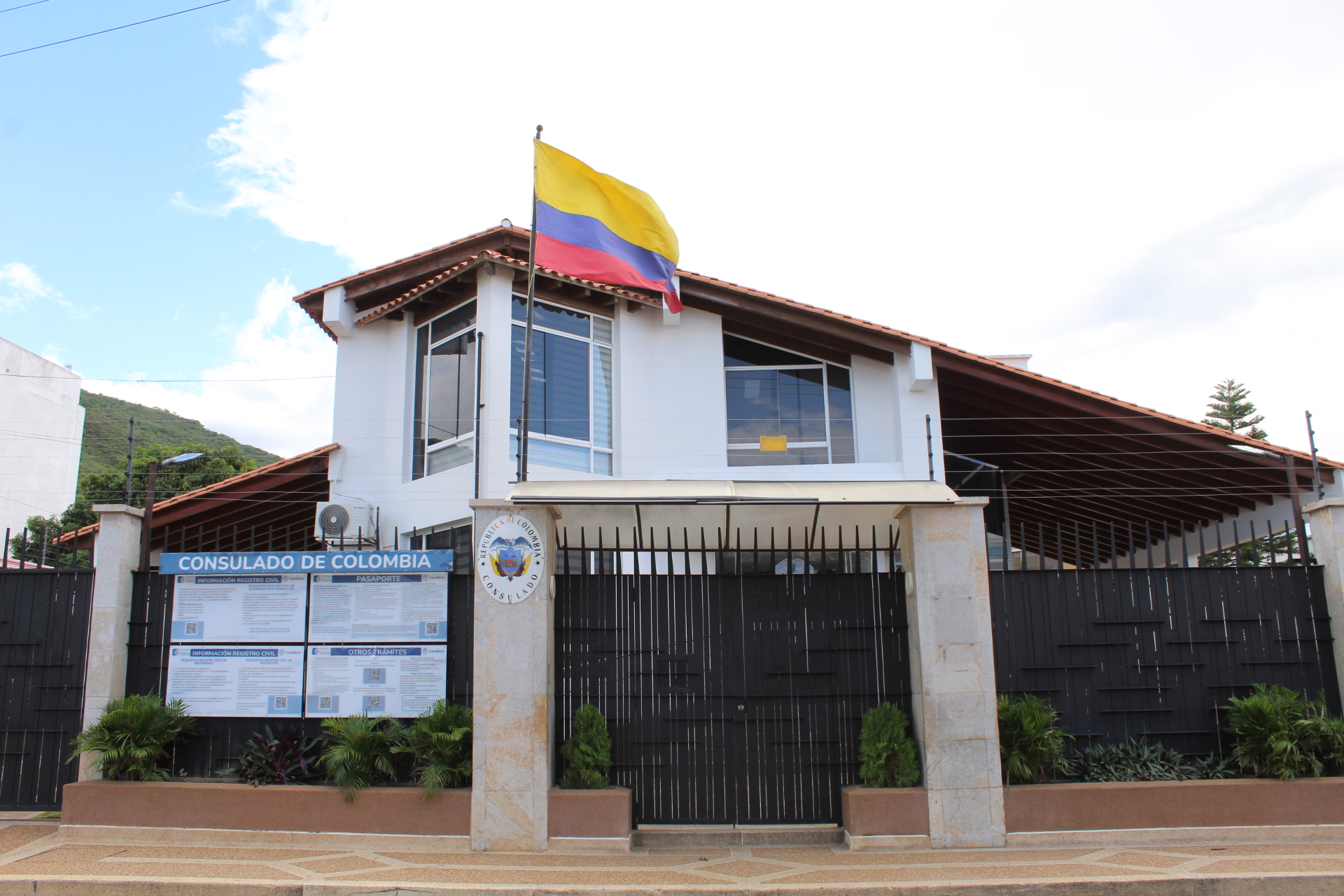
Consulate-General of Colombia in San Antonio del Tachira

=== San Cristóbal, Táchira State ===
- Colombia (Consulate-General)

=== Santa Elena de Uairén, Bolívar State ===
- Brazil (Vice-Consulate)

=== Valencia, Carabobo State ===
- Cuba (Consulate-General)
- Portugal (Consulate-General)

== Non-resident embassies accredited to Venezuela ==
Bogotá

- Australia
- Belgium
- Canada
- Denmark
- Finland
- Ireland
- Norway
- Sweden
- Taiwan (Commercial Office)
- United Arab Emirates

Brasília

- Bangladesh
- Bahrain
- Botswana
- Burkina Faso
- Cameroon
- Congo-Brazzaville
- Congo-Kinshasa
- Croatia
- Czech Republic
- Cape Verde
- Gabon
- Ghana
- Guinea
- Ivory Coast
- Jordan
- Mali
- Pakistan
- Philippines
- Singapore
- Slovakia
- Slovenia
- Senegal
- Togo
- Tanzania
- Timor-Leste
- Zimbabwe
- Zambia

Havana

- Austria
- Cambodia
- Djibouti
- Kenya
- Laos
- Yemen

Washington D.C.

- Eswatini
- Lesotho
- Mauritius
- Sierra Leone
- South Sudan
- Vanuatu

Resident elsewhere

- Afghanistan (New York City)
- Azerbaijan (New York City)
- Brunei (Ottawa)
- Bulgaria (Mexico City)
- Central African Republic (New York City)
- Costa Rica (San Jose)
- Comoros (New York City)
- Chad (New York City)
- Iceland (Madrid)
- Liberia (New York City)
- Maldives (New York City)
- Malta (Valletta)
- New Zealand (Mexico City)
- Seychelles (New York City)
- Somalia (New York City)
- Thailand (Lima)
- Tuvalu (New York City)
- Tonga (New York City)

== Closed missions ==
Host city	Sending country	Mission	Year closed	Ref.
Caracas	Argentina	Embassy (Note: Under the protecting power of Brazil.)	2024	
Caracas	Austria	Embassy (Note: Resident in Havana, Cuba)	2002	
Caracas	Australia	Embassy (Note: Resident in Bogotá, Colombia)	2002	
Caracas	Belgium	Diplomatic office	2021	
Caracas	Bulgaria	Embassy	2012	
Caracas	Canada	Embassy	2019	
Caracas	Chile	Embassy	2024	
Caracas	Costa Rica	Embassy	2020	
Caracas	Czech Republic	Embassy (Note: Resident in Brasília, Brazil)	2011	
Caracas	Dominican Republic	Embassy	2024	
Caracas	East Germany	Embassy	1990	
Caracas	Ecuador	Embassy	2024	
Caracas	El Salvador	Embassy	2019	
Caracas	Finland	Embassy	2011	
Caracas	Guatemala	Embassy	2020	
Caracas	Honduras	Embassy	2018	
Caracas	Hungary	Embassy	2009	
Caracas	Israel	Embassy (Note: Under the protecting power of Canada.)	2009	
Caracas	Jamaica	Embassy	2019	
Caracas	Morocco	Embassy	2009	
Caracas	Norway	Embassy	2013	
Caracas	Paraguay	Embassy	2019	
Caracas	Panama	Embassy	2024	
Caracas	Peru	Embassy (Note: Under the protecting power of Brazil.)	2024	
Caracas	Philippines	Embassy	2012	
Caracas	Sweden	Embassy	2000	
Caracas	Republic of China (Taiwan)	Representative Office	2009	
Caracas	Uruguay	Embassy	2024	
Barinas	Colombia	Consulate	2019	
Ciudad Guayana	Brazil	Consulate	2020	
El Amparo	Colombia	Consulate	2019	
Machiques	Colombia	Consulate	2019	
Maracaibo	United States	Consular Agency	2019	
Mérida	Colombia	Consulate	2019	
Puerto Ayacucho	Brazil	Vice-consulate	2020	
Puerto Ayacucho	Colombia	Consulate (Note: In a reopening process, following the restoration of relations with Venezuela.)	2019	
Puerto Ordaz	Peru	Consulate-General	2024	
San Carlos del Zulia	Colombia	Consulate	2019	
San Fernando de Atabapo	Colombia	Consulate	2019	
Valencia	Colombia	Consulate	2019	

== See also ==
- Foreign relations of Venezuela
- List of diplomatic missions of Venezuela
