= Visa policy of Venezuela =

Policy on permits required to enter Venezuela

Visitors to Venezuela must obtain an e-Visa unless they are citizens from one of the visa-exempt countries.

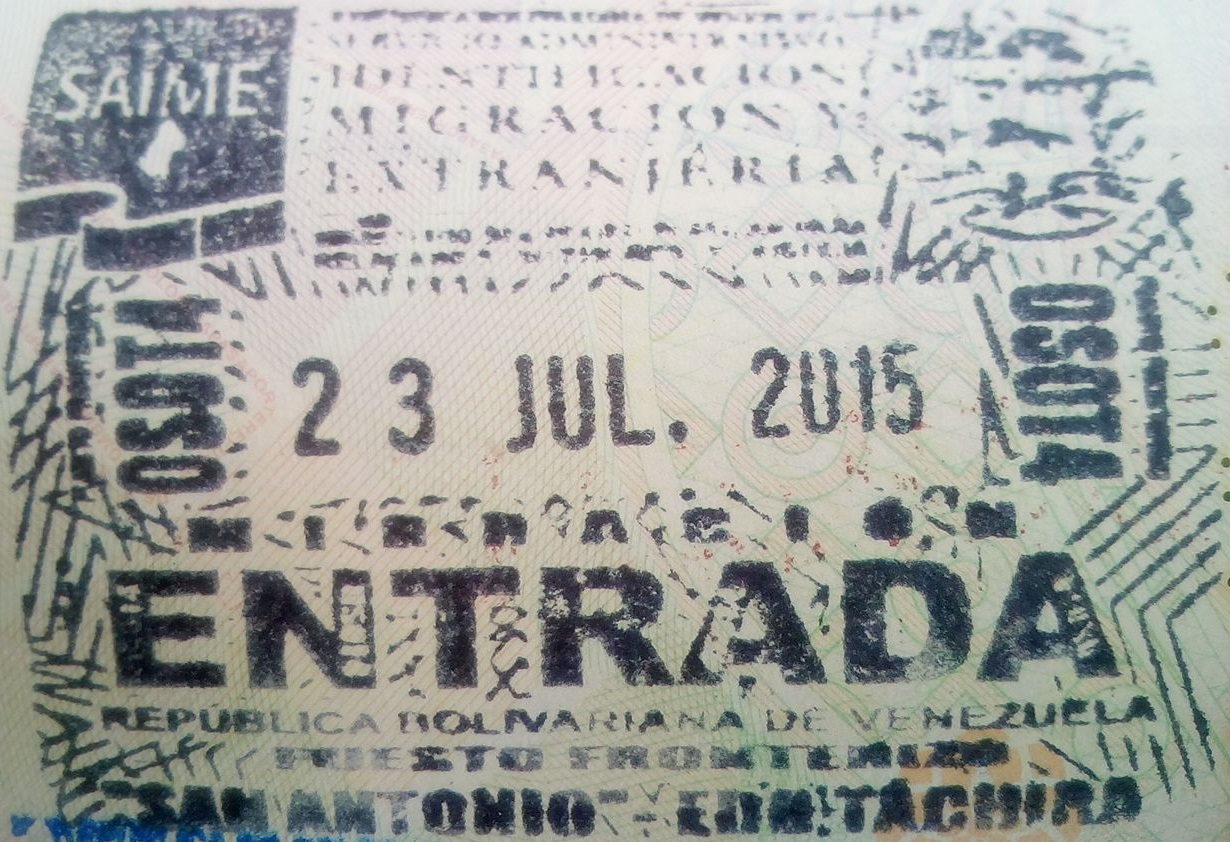
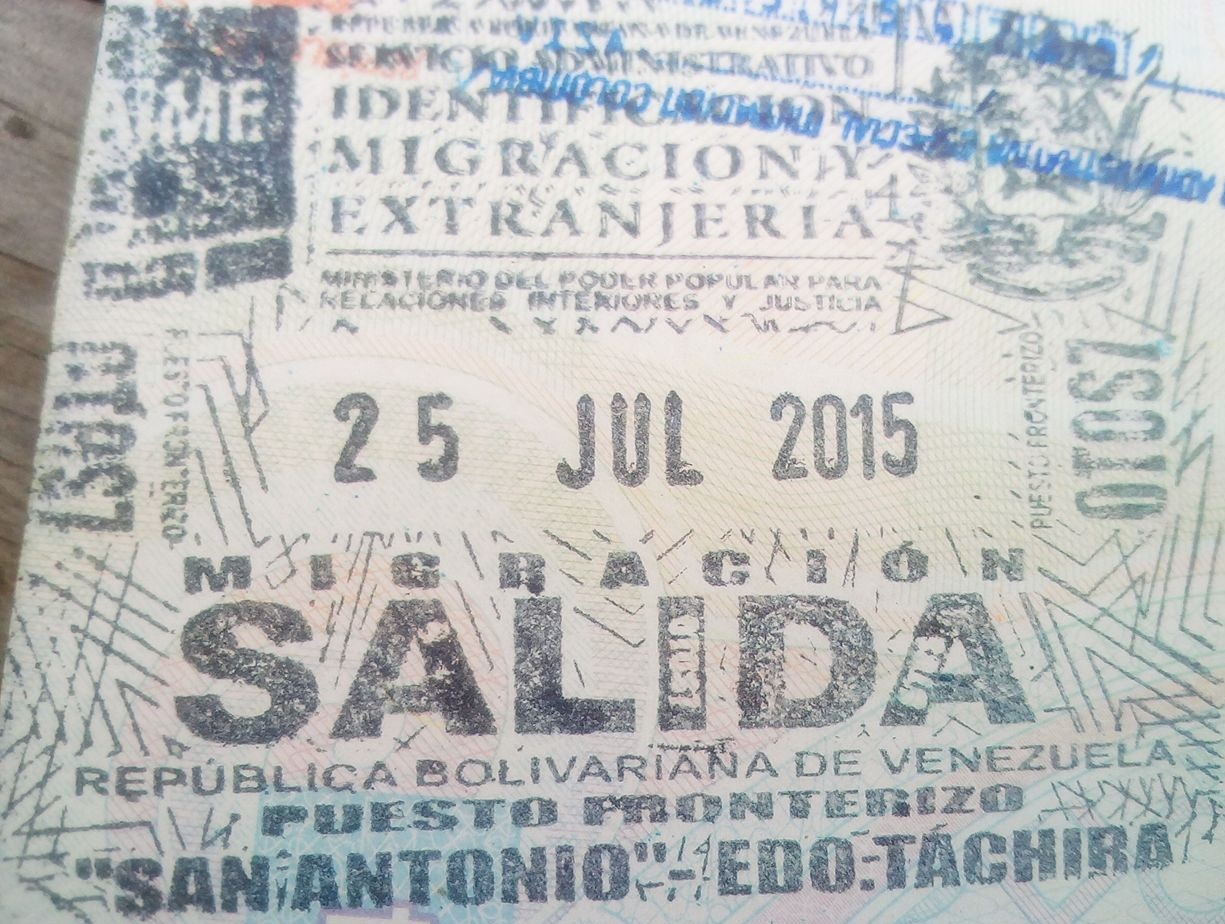
Entry and exit stamps

Visitors are required to hold proof of sufficient funds to cover their stay and documents required for their next destination. Visitors not holding return / onward tickets could be refused entry.

Naturalized Venezuelan citizens, must hold in addition to their passport and National Identity Card (Cedula de Identidad), the original (or certified copy) of the official decree (Gaceta Oficial) of their naturalization issued by the Venezuelan government.

All visitors must hold a passport valid for at least 6 months from the date of arrival.

== Visa policy map ==
Visa policy of Venezuela Venezuela Visa not required - may enter with an ID card (90 days) Visa not required (90 days) eVisa Admission refused

== Visa exemption ==
=== Ordinary passports ===
Citizens of the following countries and territories may enter Venezuela without a visa for tourist purposes for stays up to the duration listed below. The stay may be extended for an additional 90 days (except for citizens of Bolivia and Colombia). The visa-free entry applies only to those who arrive by air.

90 days

- All European Union member states

- Andorra
- Antigua and Barbuda
- Argentina
- Australia
- Barbados
- Belarus
- Belize
- Bolivia^{1}
- Brazil^{ID}
- Colombia
- Costa Rica
- Dominica
- Ecuador
- Grenada
- Hong Kong
- Iceland
- Indonesia
- Iran
- Jamaica
- Japan
- Liechtenstein
- Malaysia
- Maldives
- Mexico
- Monaco
- Nicaragua
- New Zealand
- Norway
- Oman
- Palestine
- Qatar
- Saint Kitts and Nevis
- Saint Lucia
- Saint Vincent and the Grenadines
- San Marino
- Serbia
- South Africa
- South Korea
- Sri Lanka
- Switzerland
- Trinidad and Tobago
- Turkey
- United Kingdom
- Uruguay

90 days within any 180 days

- Russia

_{ID - May enter with an ID card in lieu of a passport.}
_{1 - Must hold a confirmation of hotel reservation or notarized invitation letter.}

Date of visa changes
- 19 June 2008: Belarus
- 6 March 2009: Russia
- April 2025: Serbia

Cancelled:

- 27 March 2007: Taiwan
- 3 March 2015: United States
- 16 October 2017: Panama
- 10 April 2018: Guatemala
- 15 June 2019: Peru
- 11 July 2019: Canada
- 29 August 2019: Chile and Ecuador (resumed)

=== Non-ordinary passports ===
Holders of diplomatic or official / service passport holders of Algeria, Austria, Barbados, Belarus, Belize, Bolivia, Brazil, Bulgaria, Chile, Costa Rica, Cuba, Czech Republic, Ecuador, El Salvador, France, Gambia, Germany, Ghana, Guatemala, Guinea, Guyana, Honduras, Hungary, India, Israel, Jamaica, Kyrgyzstan, Latvia, Lebanon, Libya, Lithuania, Mexico, Namibia, Nicaragua, Oman, Panama, Peru, Philippines, Poland, Romania, Russia, Serbia Slovakia, Spain, Switzerland, Syria, Trinidad and Tobago, United Kingdom, Uruguay, Vietnam and for holders of diplomatic passports of Colombia, Italy, Portugal, Qatar and Suriname may enter Venezuela without a visa for up to 90 days.

Holders of diplomatic or official / service passports of Angola, China, Indonesia, Iran, Singapore, South Korea and Turkey may enter Venezuela without a visa for up to 30 days.

Holders of ordinary passports for public affairs issued by China may enter Venezuela without a visa for up to 30 days.

=== Future changes ===
Venezuela has signed visa exemption agreements with the following countries, but they have not yet entered into force:

Country	Passports	Agreement signed on
Jordan	Diplomatic, service	28 September 2024
Zimbabwe	Diplomatic, service	June 2024
Tajikistan	Diplomatic, service	September 2022

== Electronic visa (e-Visa) ==
Citizens of other countries may apply for an e-Visa.

== Taiwan ==
Citizens of Taiwan cannot apply for an e-Visa. Taiwan is not included when applying for an e-Visa. Venezuela has stopped issuing business and tourist visas to holders of Taiwanese passports.

== See also ==
- Visa requirements for Venezuelan citizens
- List of diplomatic missions of Venezuela
