= List of diplomatic missions of Venezuela =

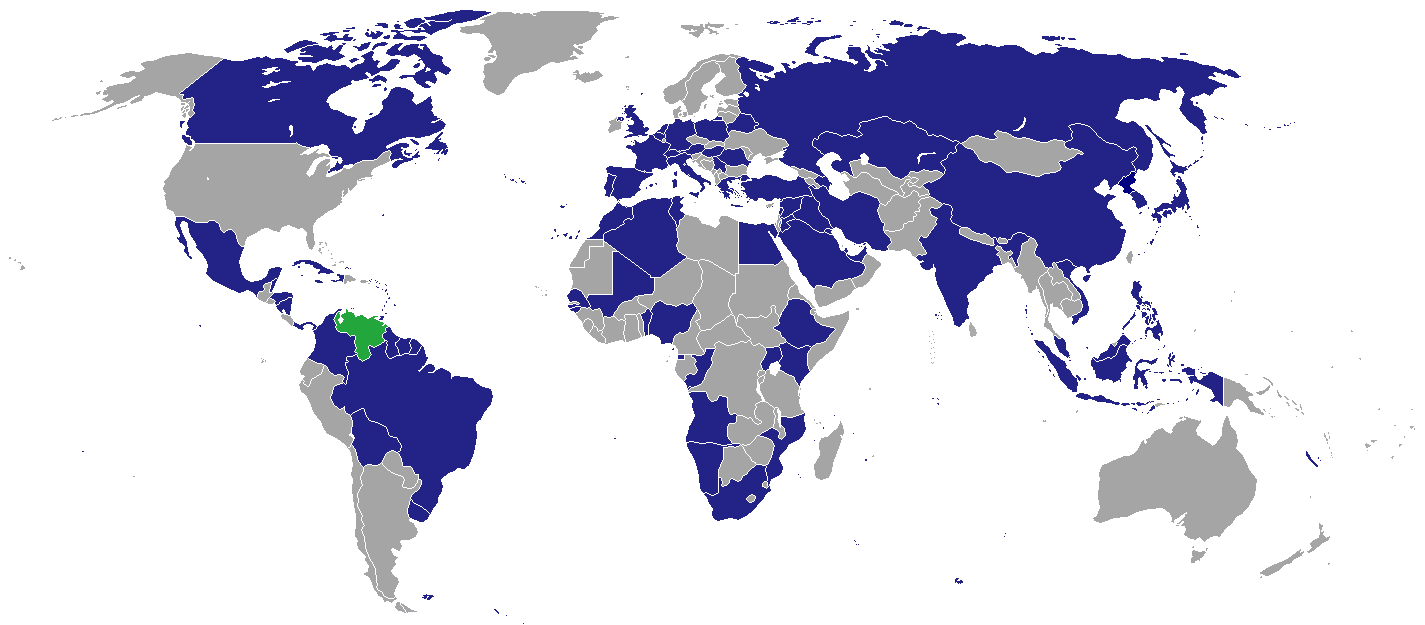
Diplomatic missions of Venezuela

This is a list of diplomatic missions of Venezuela, excluding honorary consulates. Venezuela has an extensive global diplomatic presence and is the Latin American country with the third highest number of diplomatic missions after Brazil and Cuba.

== Current missions ==
=== Africa ===
Host country	Host city	Mission	Concurrent accreditation	Ref.
Algeria	Algiers	Embassy	Countries: Mauritania; Sahrawi Republic	
Angola	Luanda	Embassy	Countries: São Tomé and Príncipe; Zambia	
Benin	Cotonou	Embassy	Countries: Ghana; Ivory Coast; Togo; International Organizations: International Cocoa Organization	
Congo-Brazzaville	Brazzaville	Embassy	Countries: Central African Republic; Congo-Kinshasa; International Organizations: African Petroleum Producers' Organization	
Egypt	Cairo	Embassy	Countries: Eritrea; Sudan; International Organizations: Arab League	
Equatorial Guinea	Malabo	Embassy	Countries: Cameroon; Gabon	
Ethiopia	Addis Ababa	Embassy	Countries: Djibouti; South Sudan; International Organizations: African Union	
Guinea-Bissau	Bissau	Embassy		
Kenya	Nairobi	Embassy	Countries: Somalia; Tanzania; International Organizations: United Nations Human Settlements Programme	
Mali	Bamako	Embassy	Countries: Burkina Faso	
Morocco	Rabat	Embassy		
Mozambique	Maputo	Embassy	Countries: Eswatini; Malawi	
Namibia	Windhoek	Embassy	Countries: Botswana; Zimbabwe; International Organizations: Southern African Development Community	
Nigeria	Abuja	Embassy	Countries: Chad; Liberia; Sierra Leone	
Senegal	Dakar	Embassy	Countries: Cape Verde; Gambia	
South Africa	Pretoria	Embassy	Countries: Comoros; Madagascar; Lesotho; Mauritius; Seychelles	
Tunisia	Tunis	Embassy	Countries: Libya	
Uganda	Kampala	Embassy	Countries: Burundi; Rwanda	

=== Americas ===
Host country	Host city	Mission	Concurrent accreditation	Ref.
Antigua and Barbuda	St. John's	Embassy		
Barbados	Bridgetown	Embassy		
Belize	Belmopan	Embassy		
Bolivia	La Paz	Embassy		
Brazil	Brasília	Embassy		
Brazil	São Paulo	Consulate-General		
Canada	Ottawa	Embassy		
Colombia	Bogotá	Embassy		
Colombia	Bucaramanga	Consulate-General		
Colombia	Barranquilla	Consulate-General		
Colombia	Cartagena	Consulate-General		
Colombia	Cúcuta	Consulate-General		
Colombia	Medellín	Consulate-General		
Colombia	Riohacha	Consulate-General		
Cuba	Havana	Embassy		
Cuba	Havana	Consulate		
Dominica	Roseau	Embassy		
Grenada	St. George's	Embassy		
Guyana	Georgetown	Embassy		
Haiti	Port-au-Prince	Embassy		
Honduras	Tegucigalpa	Embassy		
Jamaica	Kingston	Embassy	Countries: Bahamas	
Mexico	Mexico City	Embassy		
Nicaragua	Managua	Embassy		
Panama	Panama City	Embassy		
Saint Kitts and Nevis	Basseterre	Embassy		
Saint Lucia	Castries	Embassy		
Saint Vincent and the Grenadines	Kingstown	Embassy		
Suriname	Paramaribo	Embassy		
Trinidad and Tobago	Port of Spain	Embassy		
United States	Washington, D.C.	Embassy		
Uruguay	Montevideo	Consular section		

=== Asia ===
Host country	Host city	Mission	Concurrent accreditation	Ref.
Azerbaijan	Baku	Embassy	Countries: Tajikistan	
China	Beijing	Embassy	Countries: Mongolia	
China	Guangzhou	Consulate-General	Countries: Mongolia	
China	Hong Kong	Consulate-General	Countries: Mongolia	
China	Shanghai	Consulate-General	Countries: Mongolia	
India	New Delhi	Embassy	Countries: Bangladesh; Nepal; Sri Lanka	
Indonesia	Jakarta	Embassy	International Organizations: Association of Southeast Asian Nations	
Iran	Tehran	Embassy		
Iraq	Baghdad	Embassy		
Japan	Tokyo	Embassy		
Jordan	Amman	Embassy		
Kazakhstan	Astana	Embassy	Countries: Kyrgyzstan; Uzbekistan	
Kuwait	Kuwait City	Embassy		
Lebanon	Beirut	Embassy		
Malaysia	Kuala Lumpur	Embassy	Countries: Brunei; Thailand	
North Korea	Pyongyang	Embassy		
Palestine	Ramallah	Embassy		
Philippines	Manila	Embassy		
Qatar	Doha	Embassy		
Saudi Arabia	Riyadh	Embassy	Countries: Bahrain; Oman	
Singapore	Singapore	Embassy	Countries: Timor-Leste	
South Korea	Seoul	Embassy		
Syria	Damascus	Embassy		
Turkey	Ankara	Embassy		
Turkey	Istanbul	Consulate-General		
United Arab Emirates	Abu Dhabi	Embassy		
Vietnam	Hanoi	Embassy	Countries: Cambodia; Laos; Myanmar	

=== Europe ===
Host country	Host city	Mission	Concurrent accreditation	Ref.
Austria	Vienna	Embassy	Countries: Croatia; Slovakia; Slovenia; International Organizations: United Nations	
Belarus	Minsk	Embassy		
Belgium	Brussels	Embassy	International Organizations: European Union	
France	Paris	Embassy	Countries: Andorra; Monaco	
Germany	Berlin	Embassy		
Greece	Athens	Embassy		
Holy See (Note: The Venezuelan Embassy to the Holy See is located outside Vatican territory in Rome.)	Rome	Embassy		
Hungary	Budapest	Embassy		
Italy	Rome	Embassy	Countries: Malta; International Organizations: Food and Agriculture Organization	
Italy	Milan	Consulate-General	Countries: Malta; International Organizations: Food and Agriculture Organization	
Italy	Naples	Consulate-General	Countries: Malta; International Organizations: Food and Agriculture Organization	
Netherlands	The Hague	Embassy		
Netherlands	Oranjestad, Aruba	Consulate-General		
Netherlands	Willemstad, Curaçao	Consulate-General		
Portugal	Lisbon	Embassy		
Portugal	Lisbon	Consulate-General		
Portugal	Funchal	Consulate-General		
Romania	Bucharest	Embassy		
Russia	Moscow	Embassy	Countries: Armenia	
Serbia	Belgrade	Embassy	Countries: Bulgaria; Montenegro; North Macedonia	
Spain	Madrid	Embassy		
Spain	Madrid	Consulate-General		
Spain	Barcelona	Consulate-General		
Spain	Bilbao	Consulate-General		
Spain	Santa Cruz de Tenerife	Consulate-General		
Spain	Vigo	Consulate		
Switzerland	Bern	Embassy	Countries: Liechtenstein	
United Kingdom	London	Embassy	Countries: Ireland	

=== Multilateral organizations ===
Organization	Host city	Host country	Mission	Ref.
United Nations	New York City	United States	Permanent Mission	
United Nations	Geneva	Switzerland	Permanent Mission	
UNESCO	Paris	France	Permanent Delegation	

== Embassies to open ==
- Burkina Faso
- Ghana
- Libya
- Tanzania
- Zimbabwe

== Gallery ==
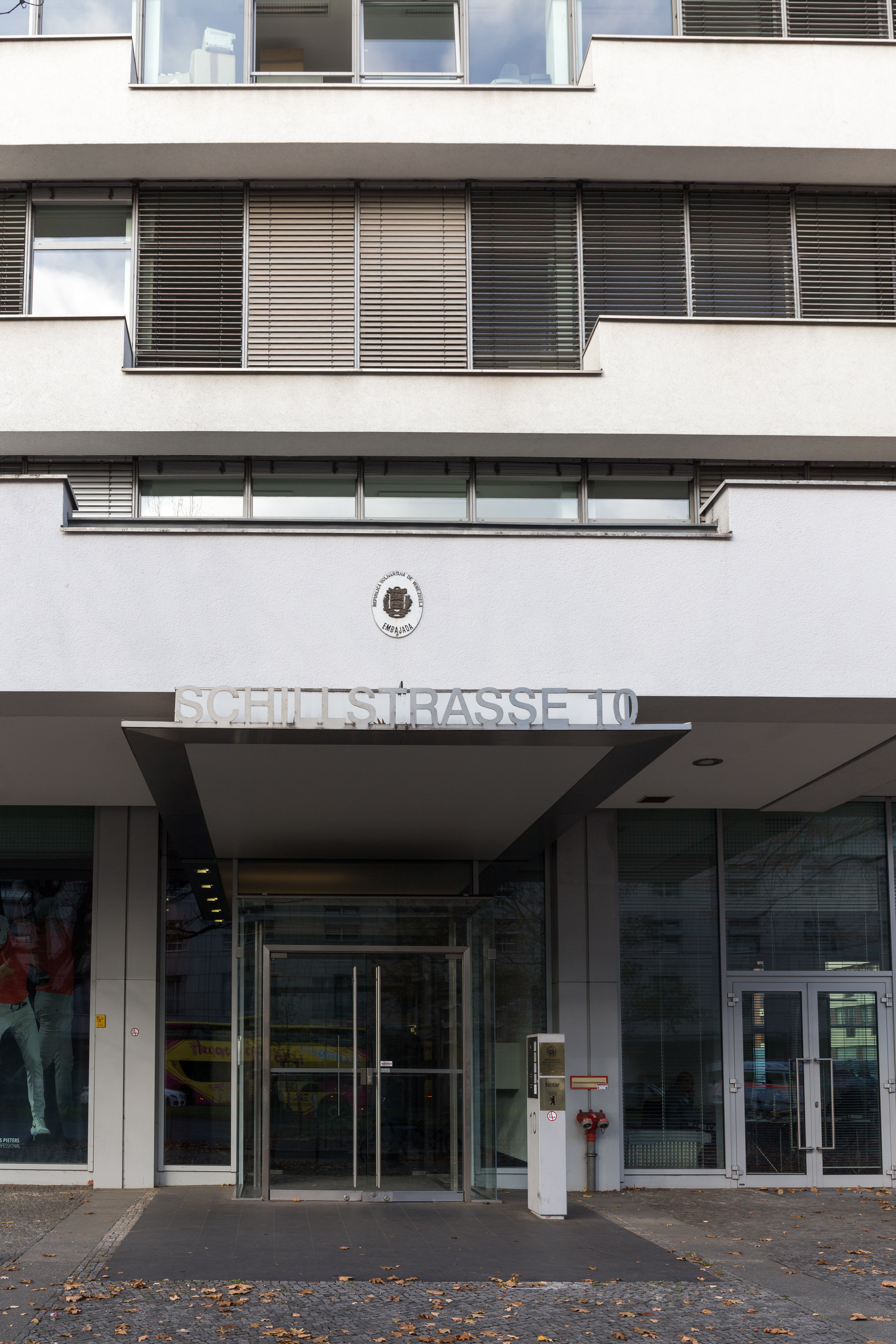
Embassy in Berlin

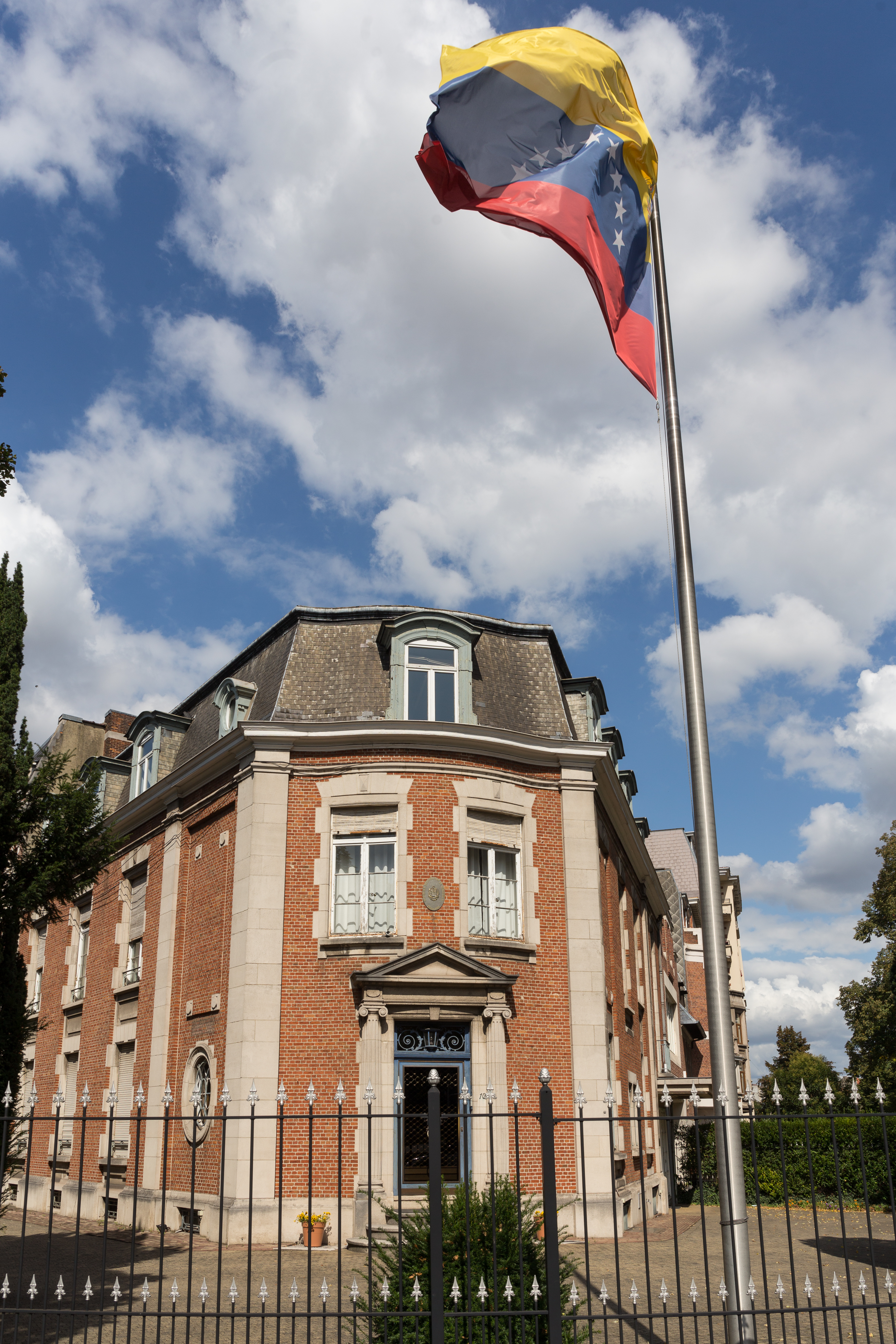
Embassy in Brussels

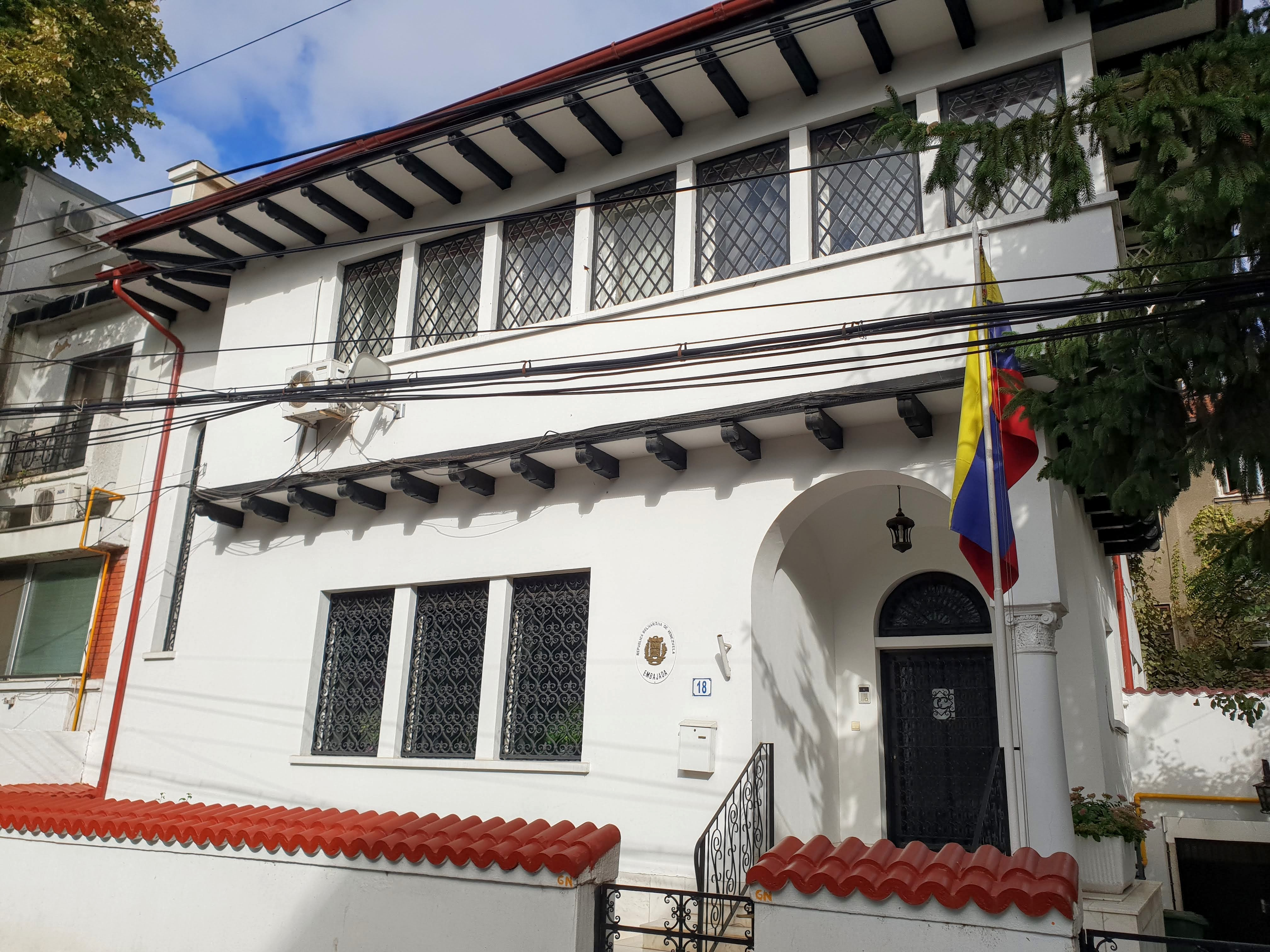
Embassy in Bucharest

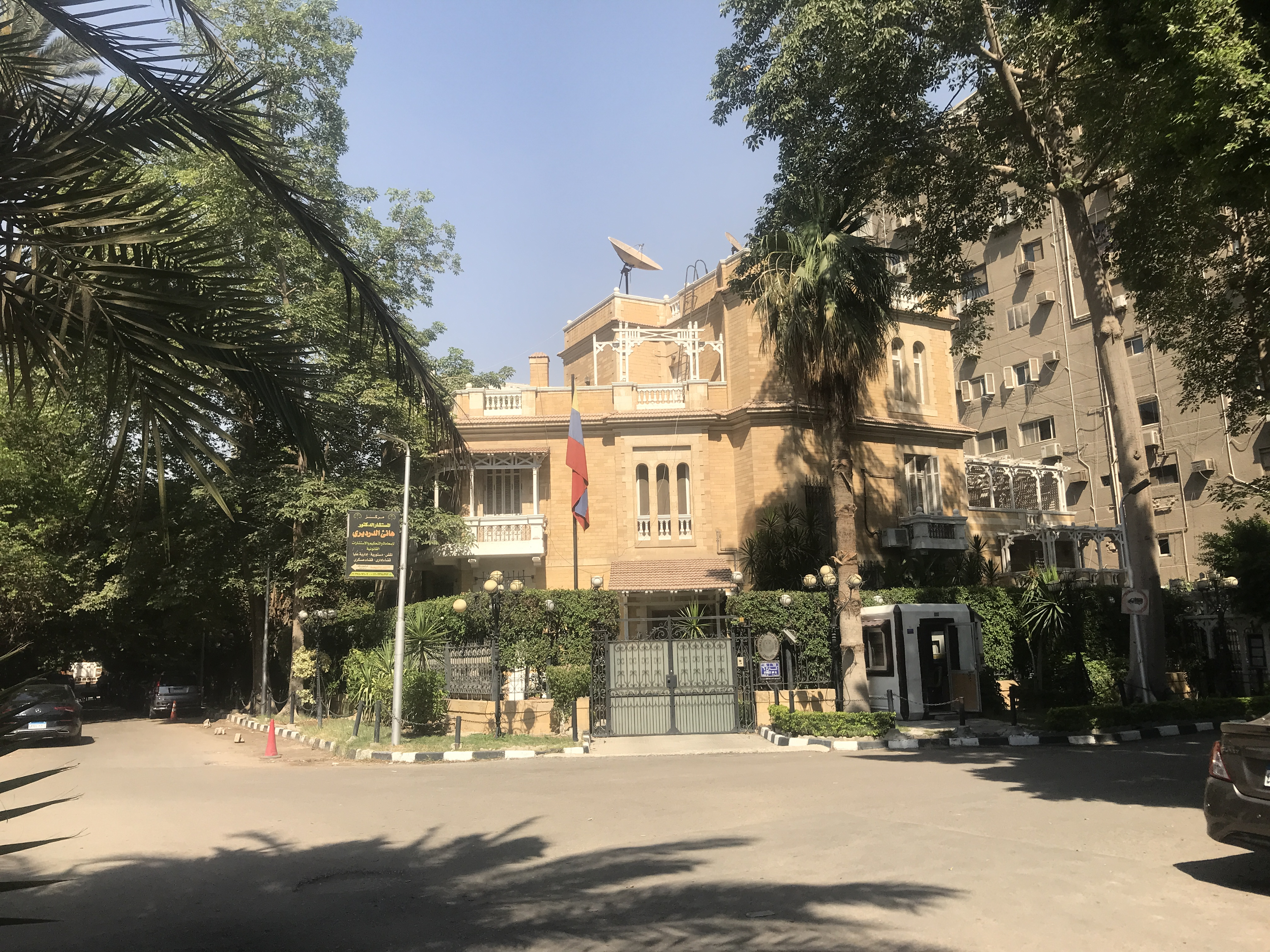
Embassy in Cairo

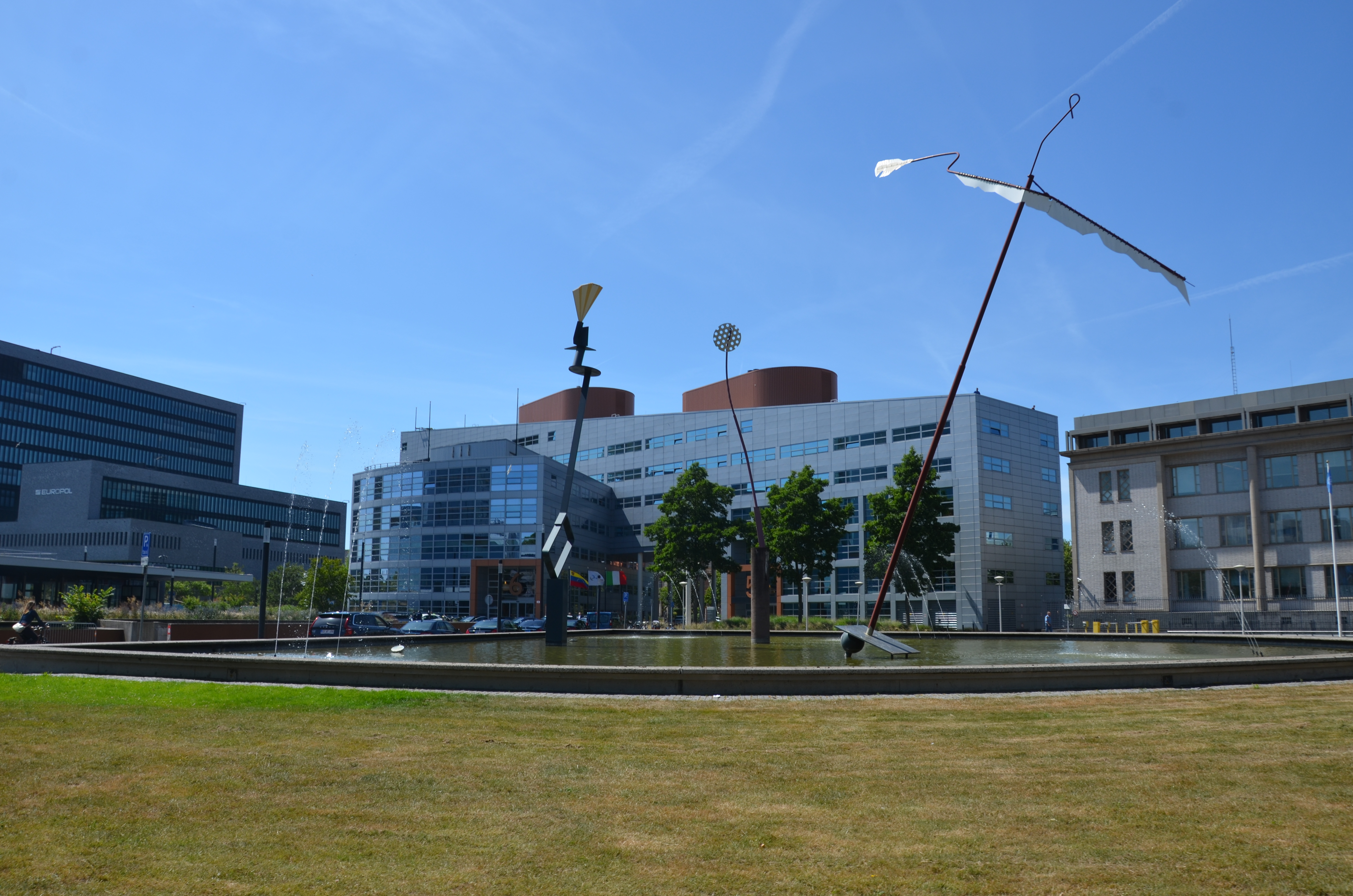
Embassy in The Hague

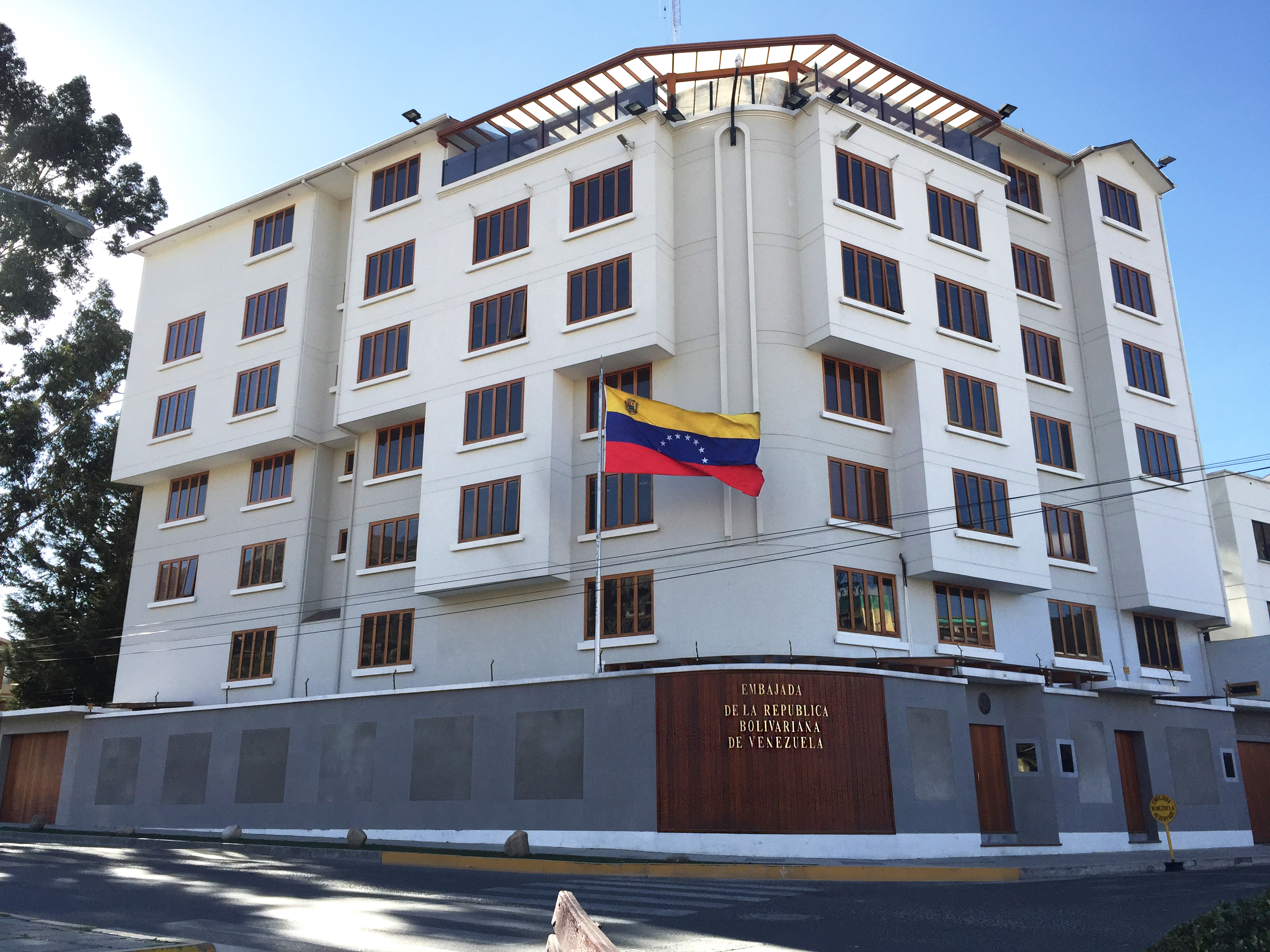
Embassy in La Paz

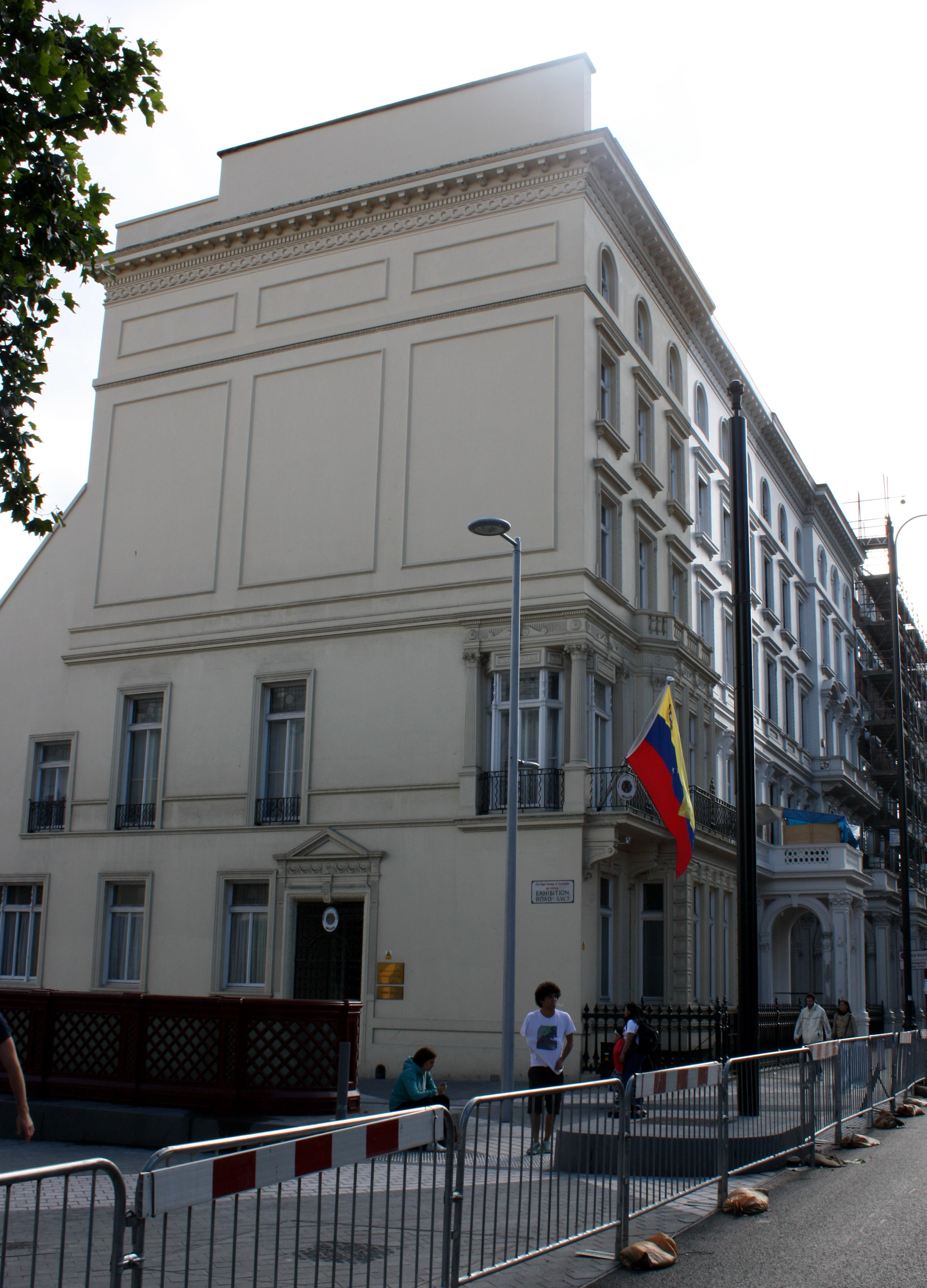
Embassy in London

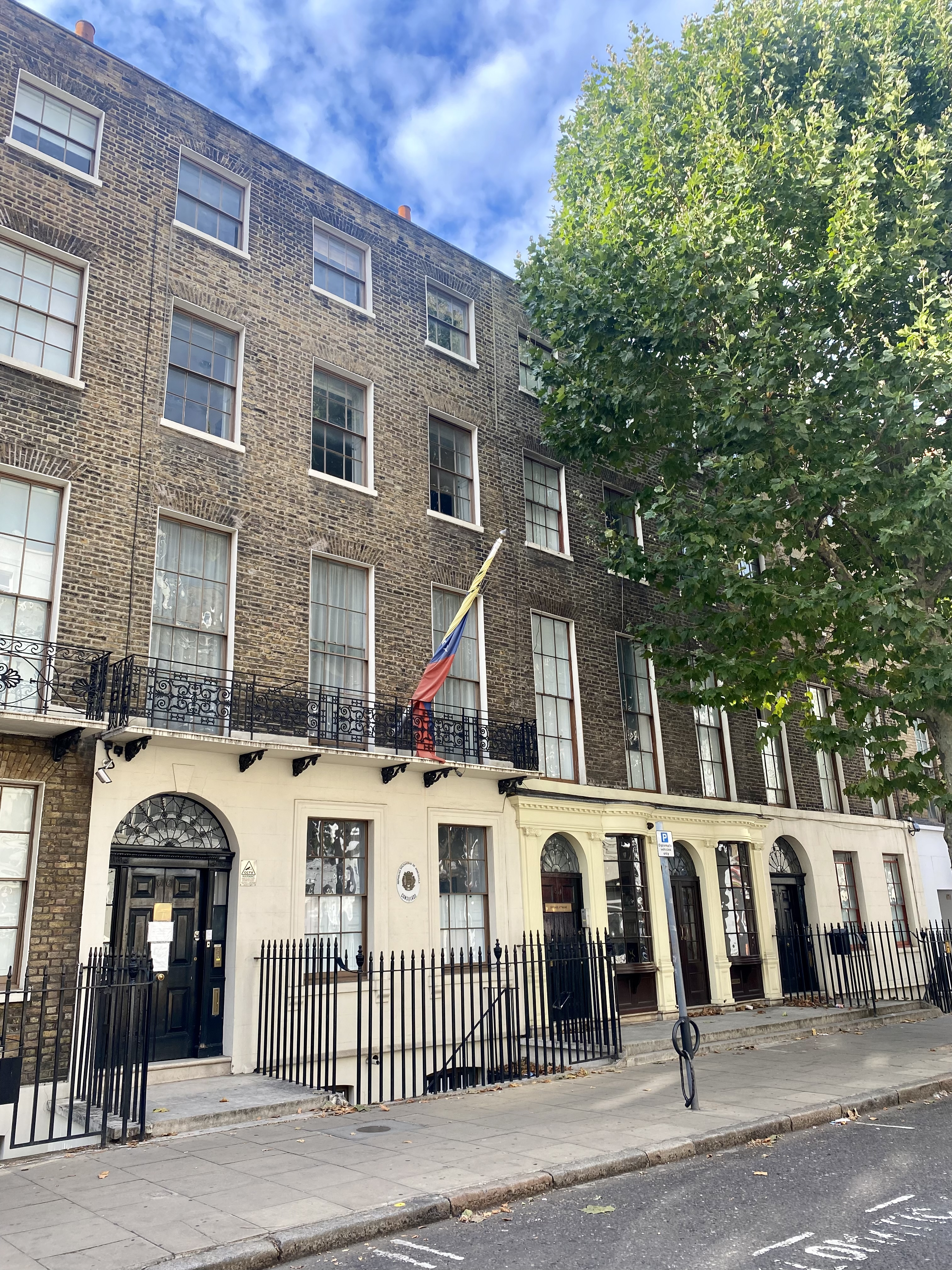
Embassy in London (Consular section)

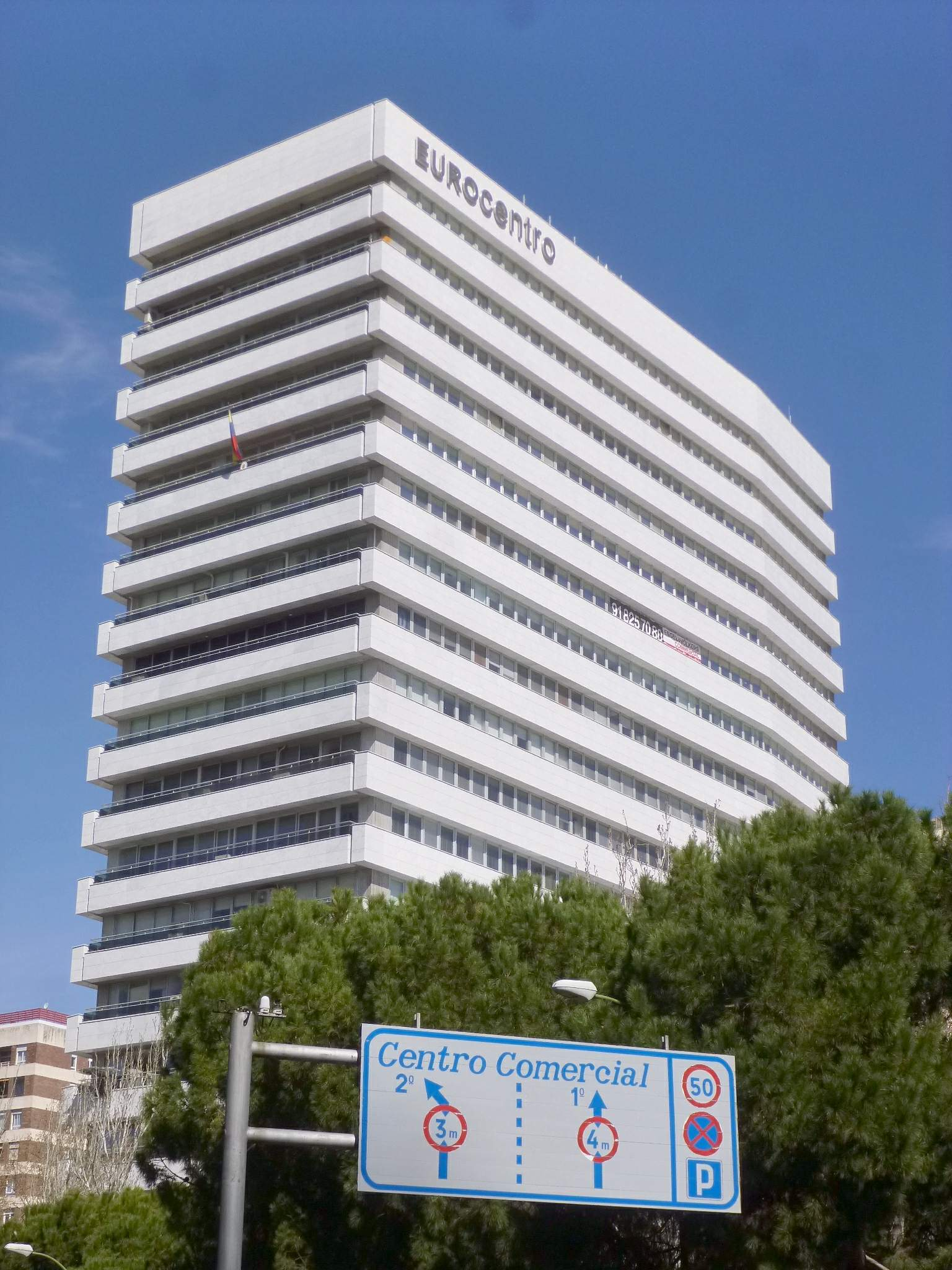
Embassy in Madrid

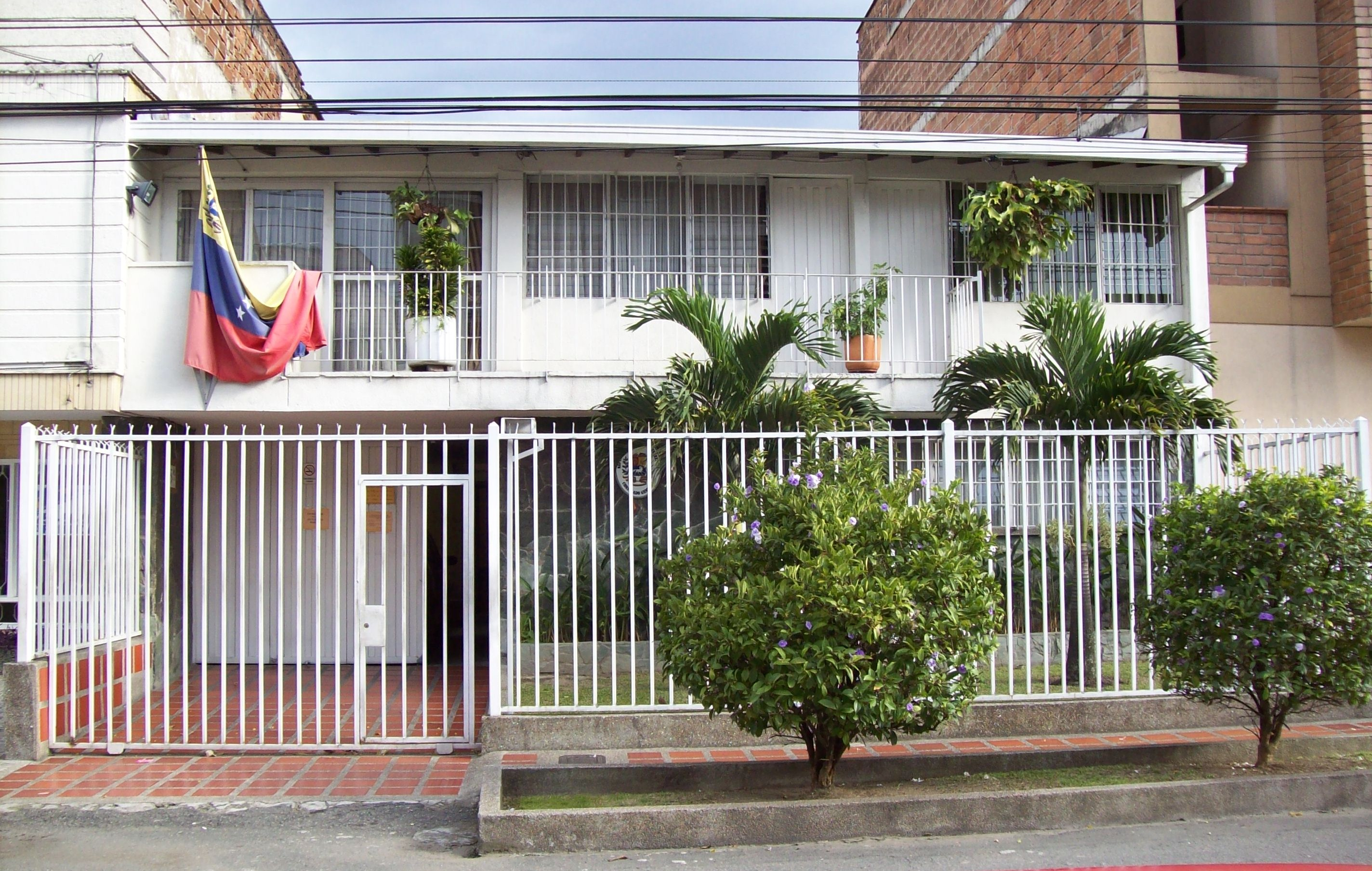
Consulate-General in Medellín

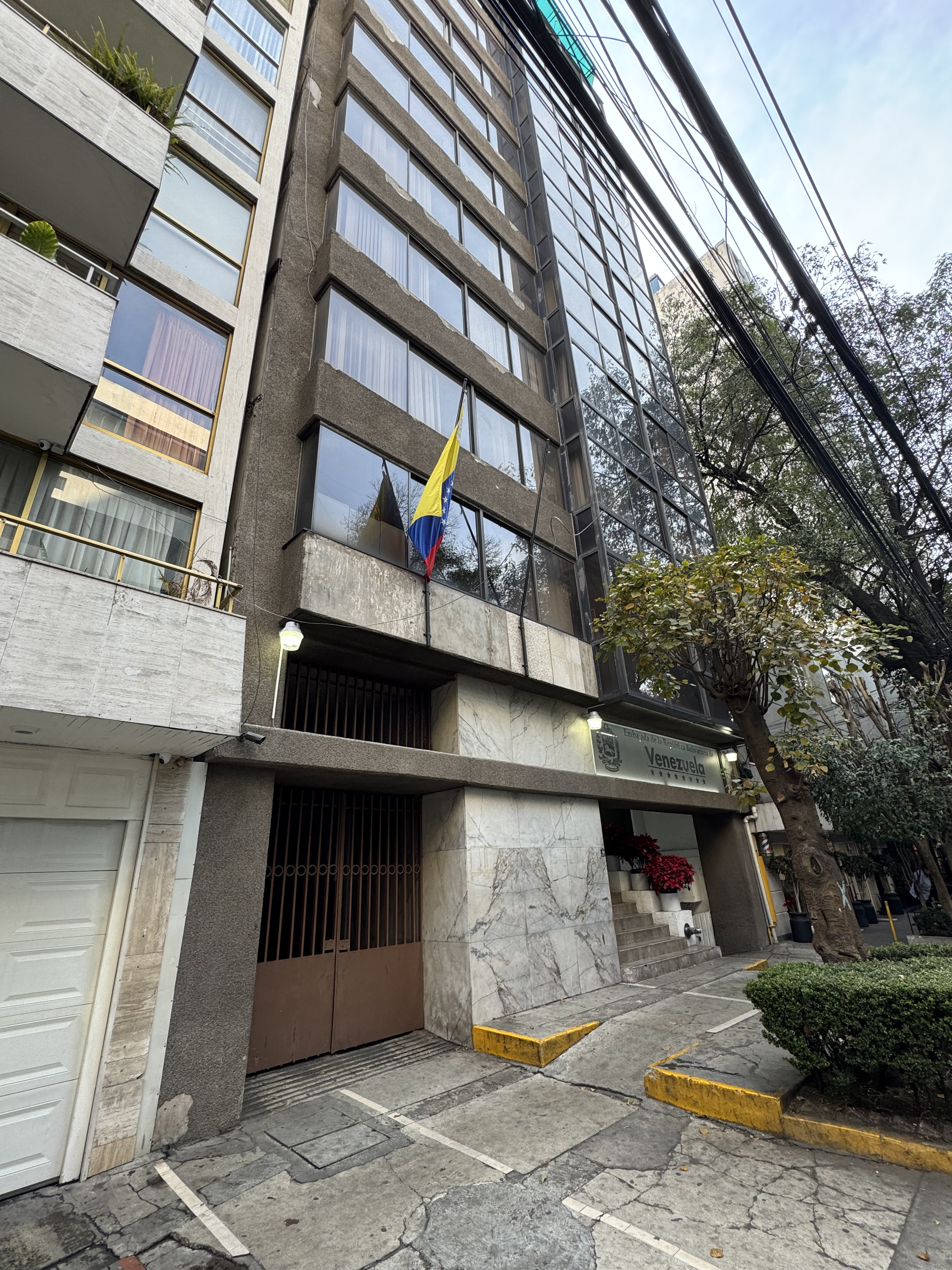
Embassy in Mexico City

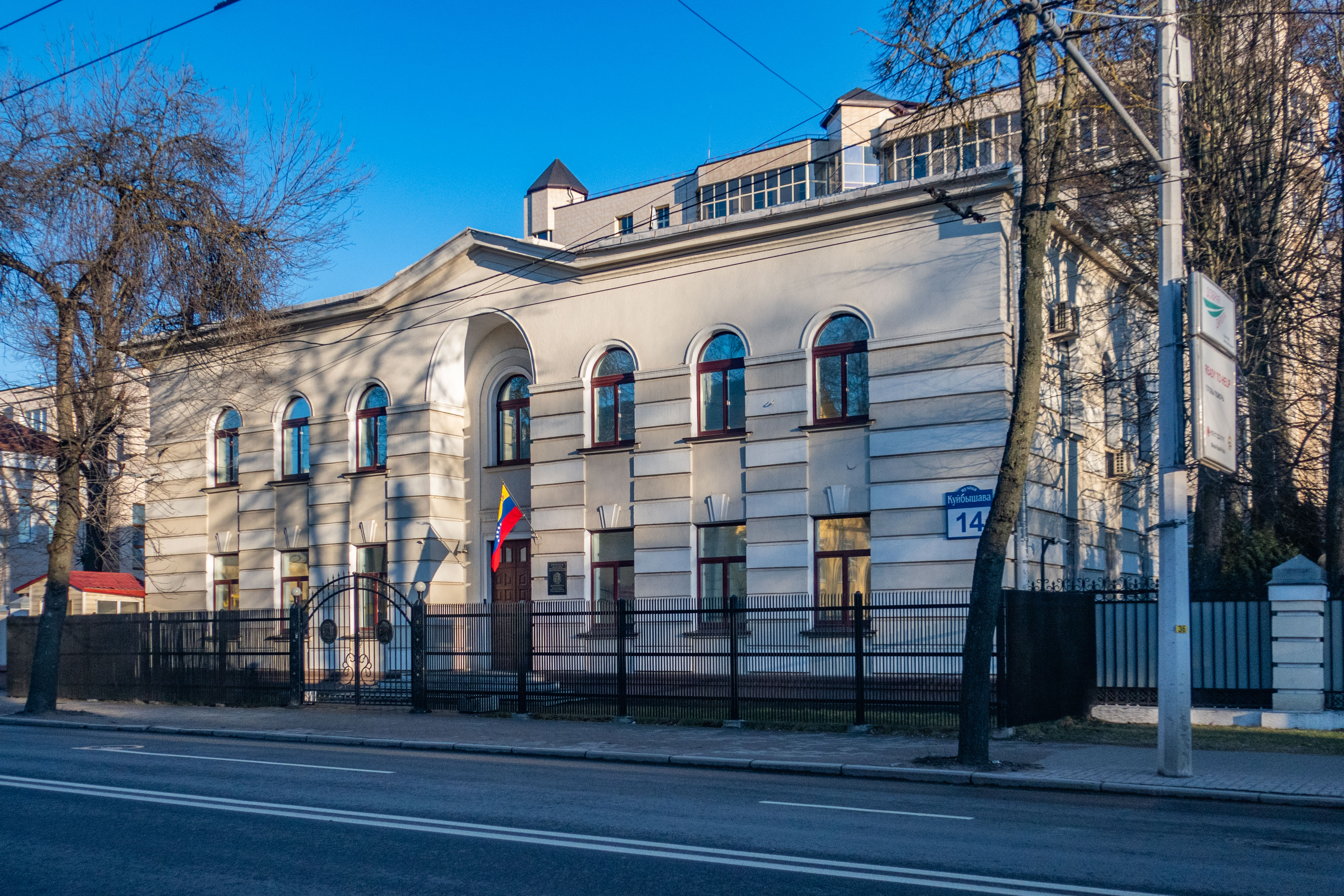
Embassy in Minsk

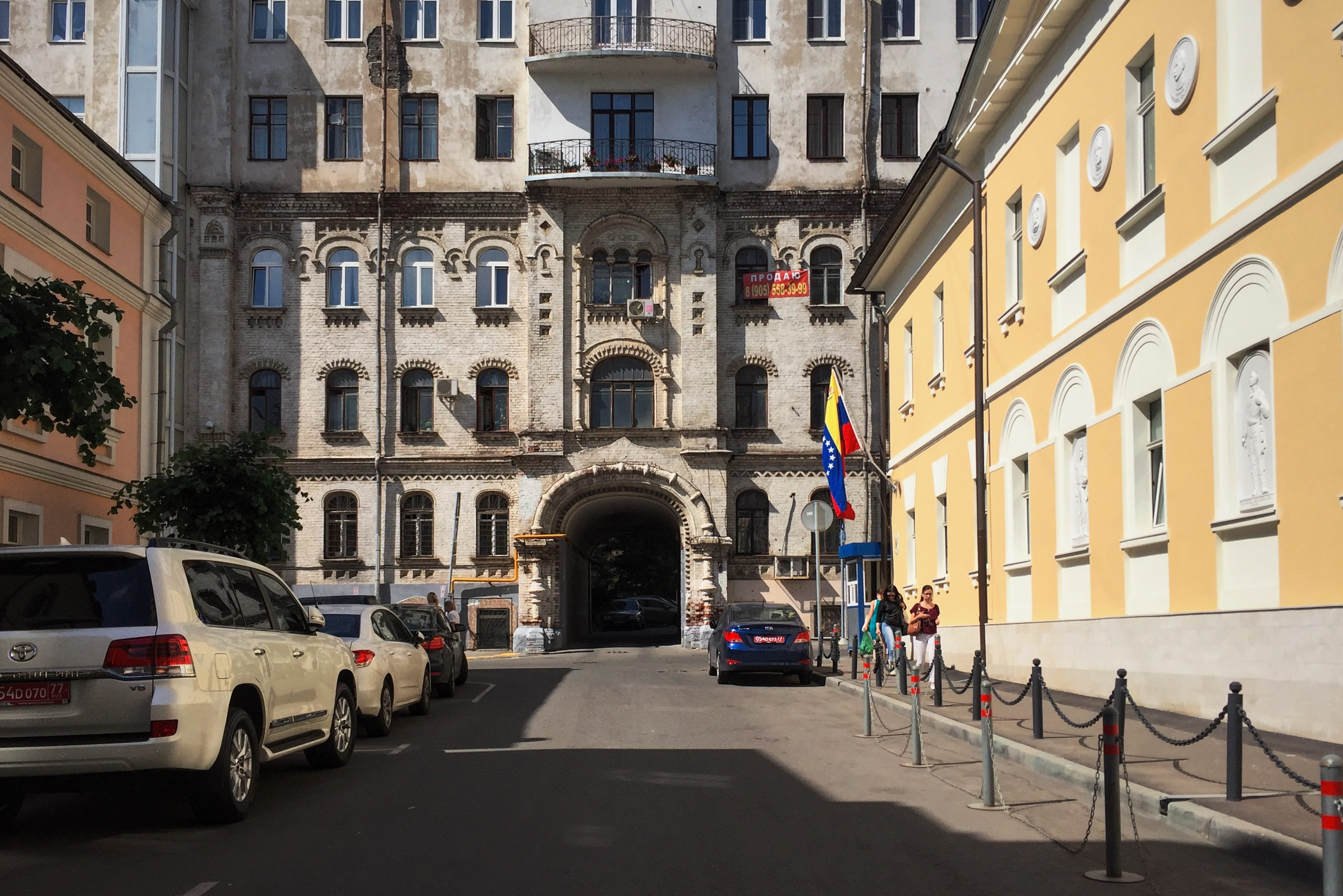
Embassy in Moscow

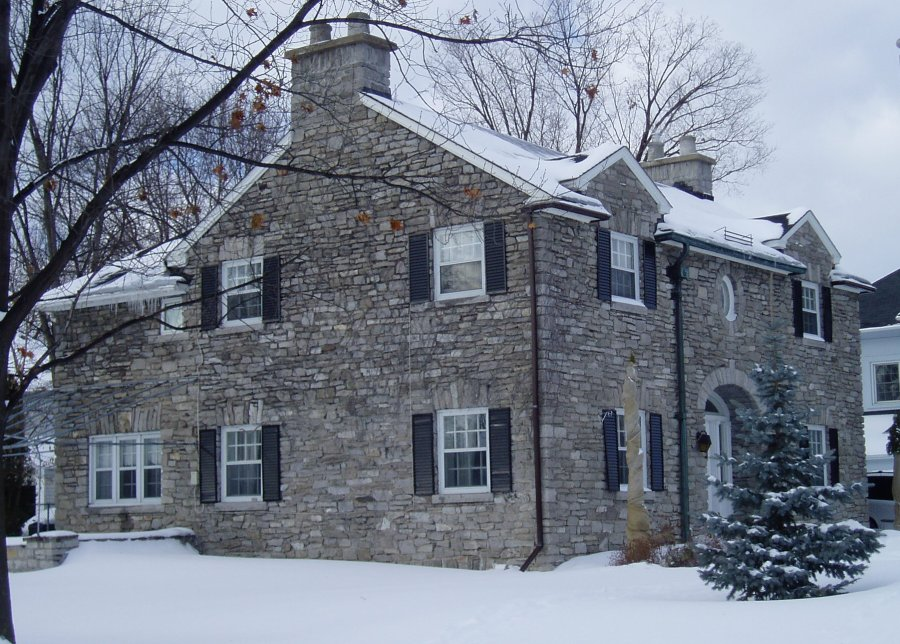
Embassy in Ottawa

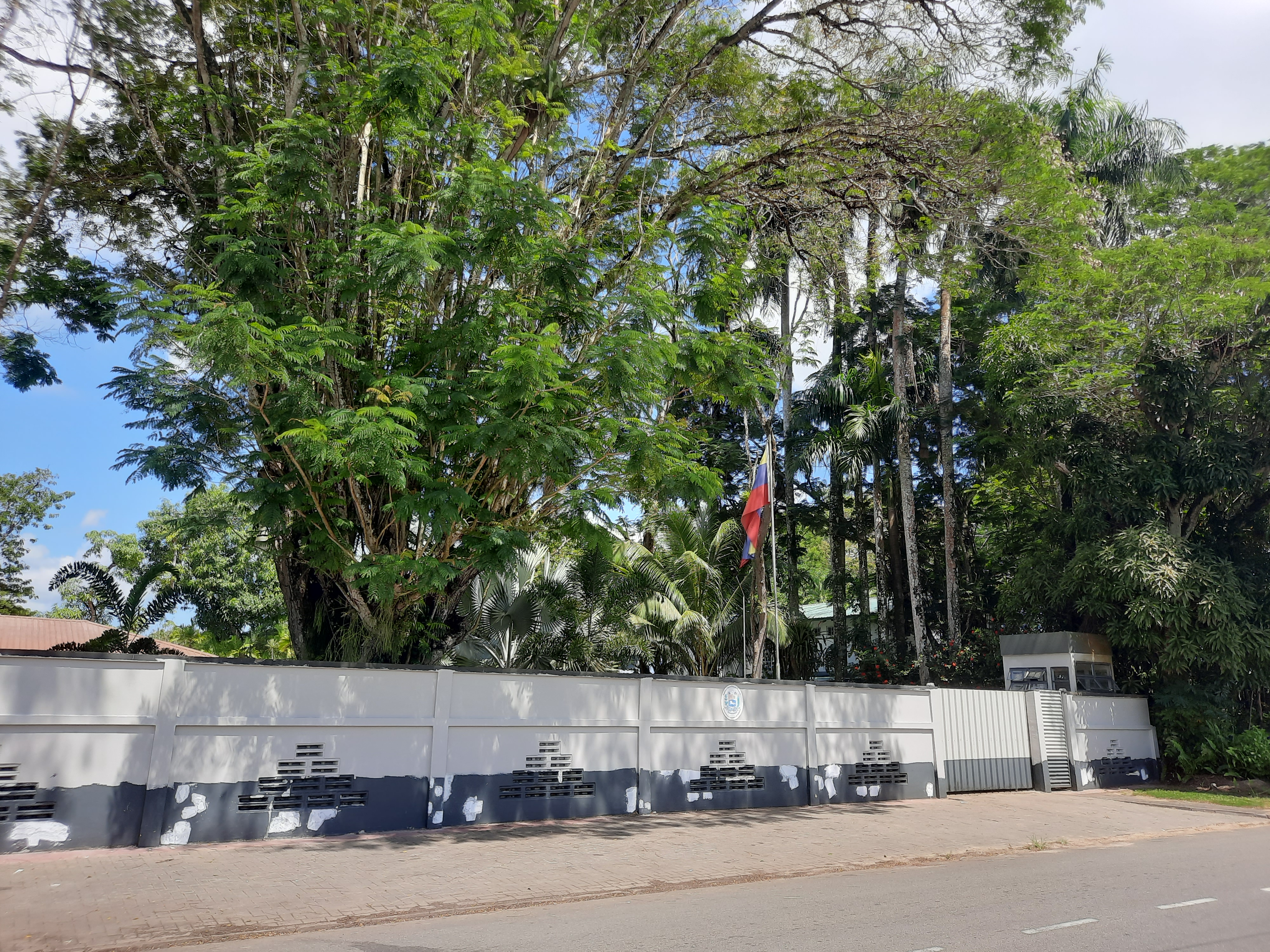
Embassy in Paramaribo

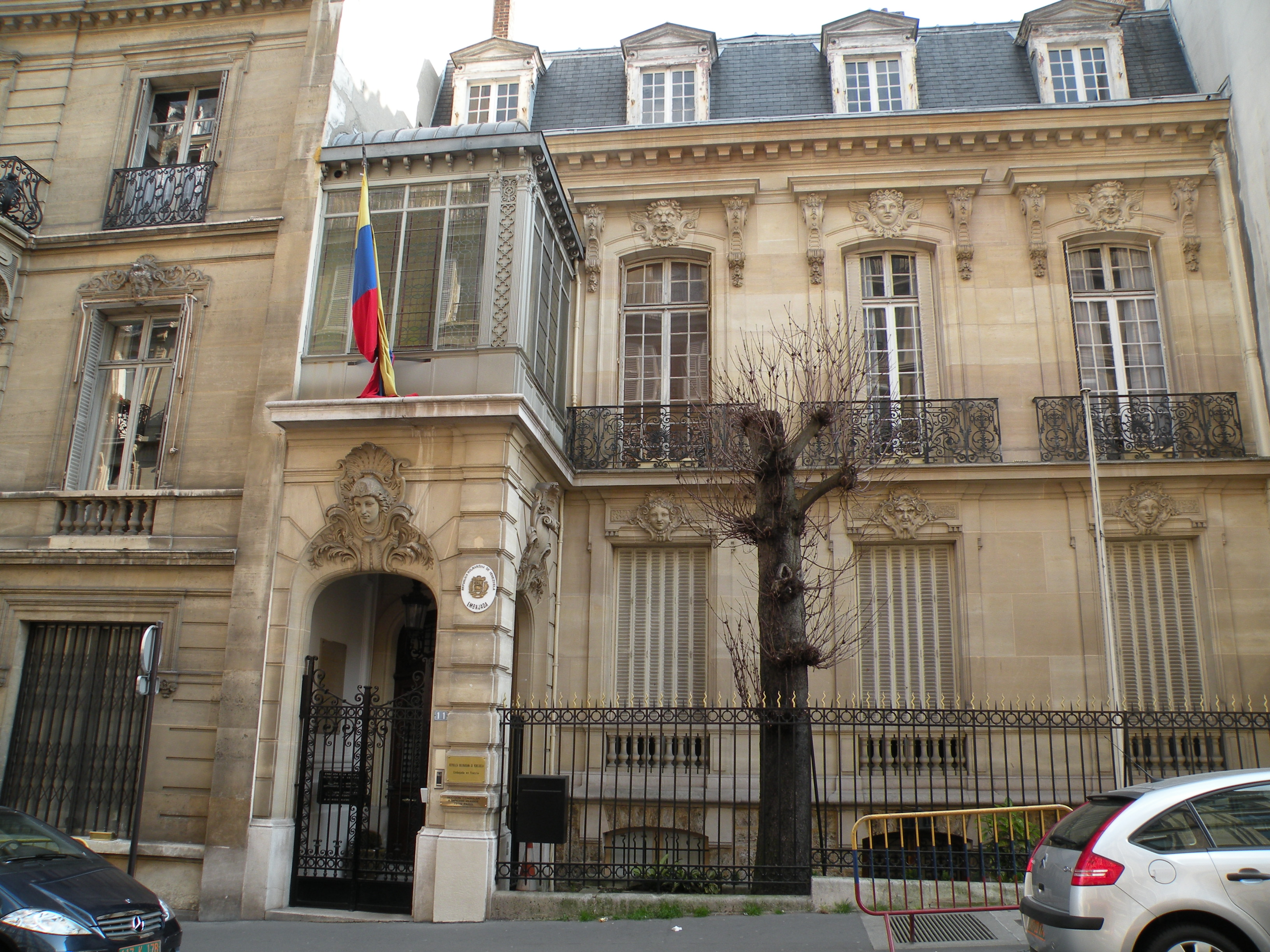
Embassy in Paris

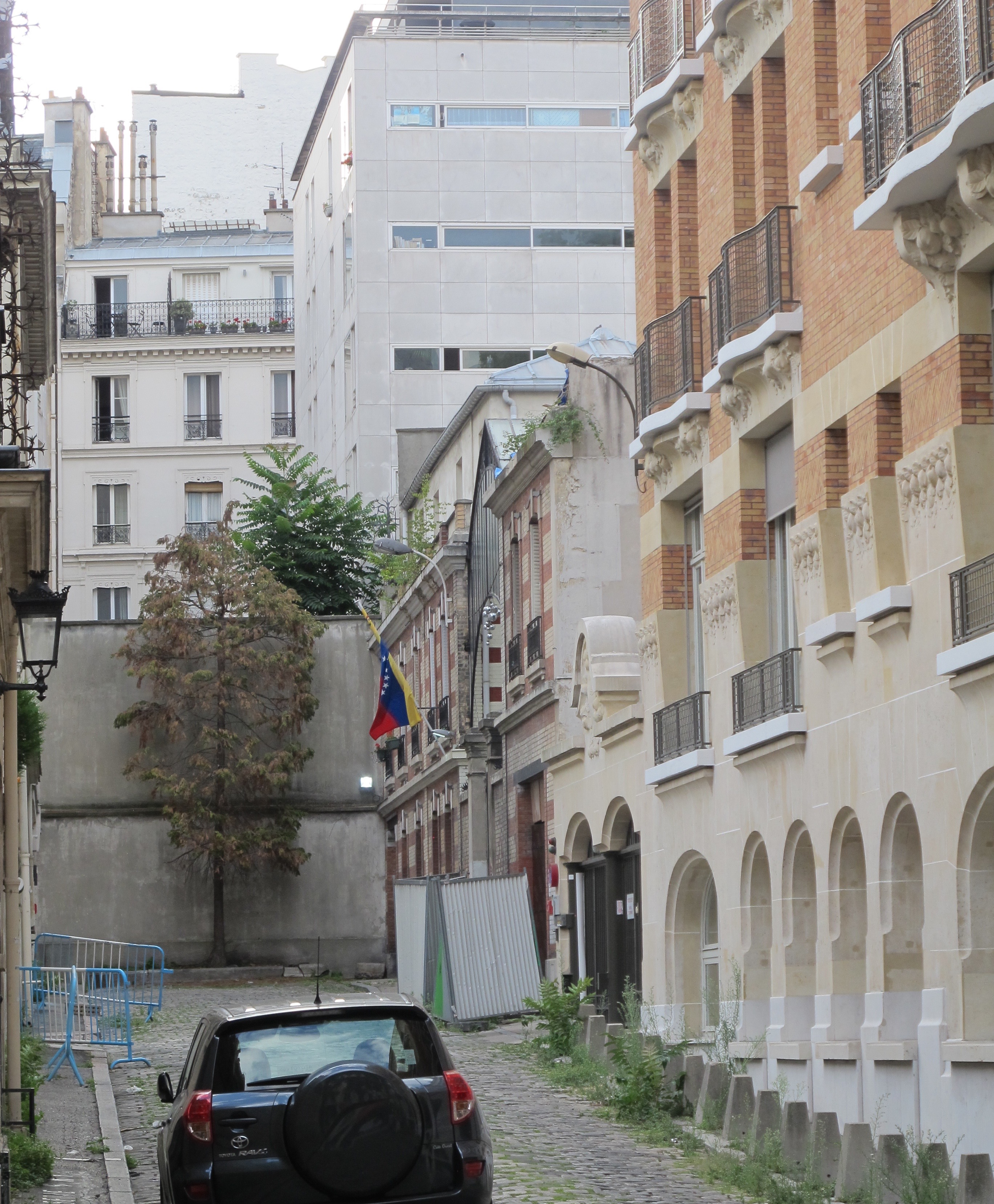
Embassy in Paris (Consular section)

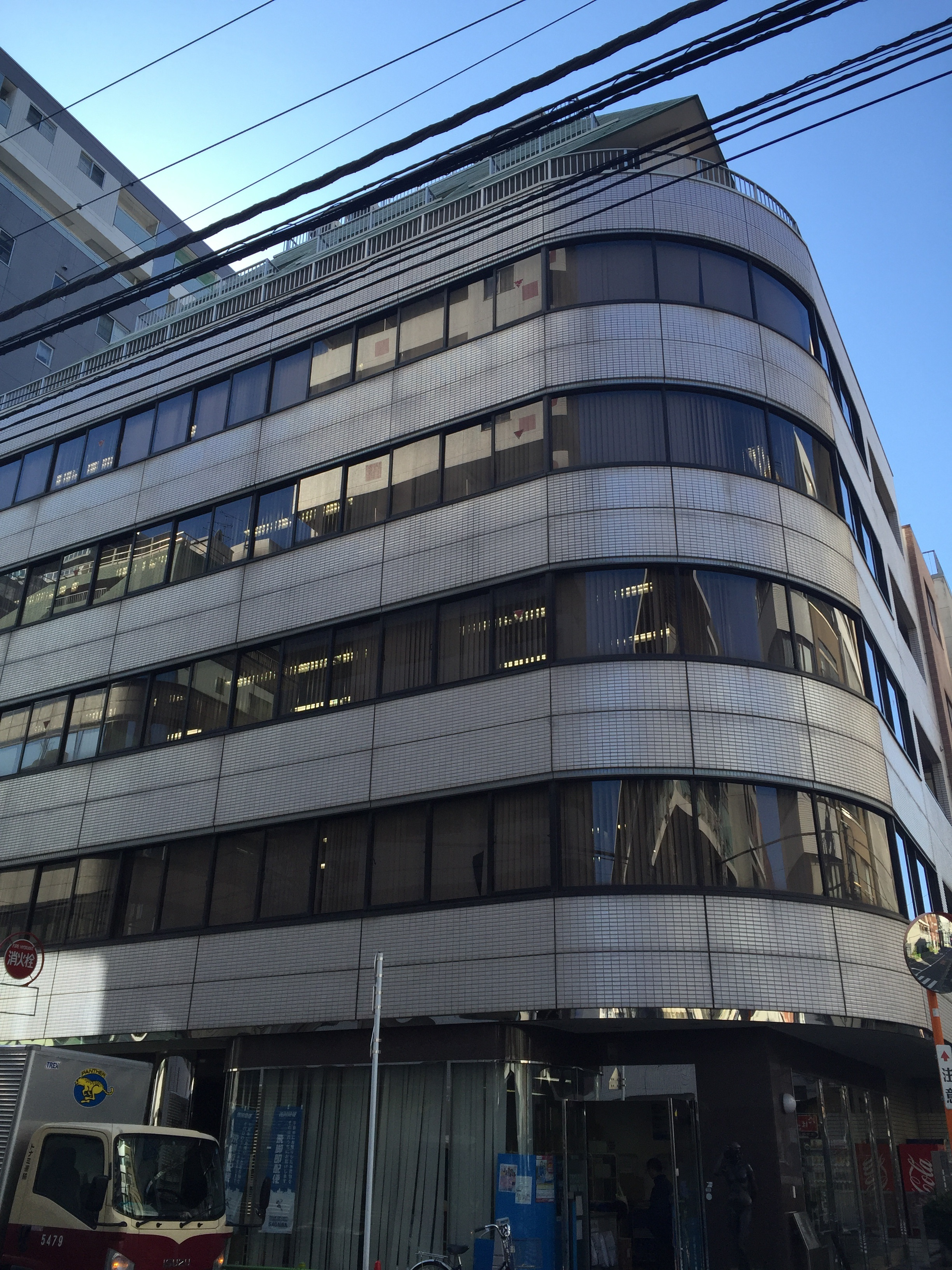
Embassy in Tokyo

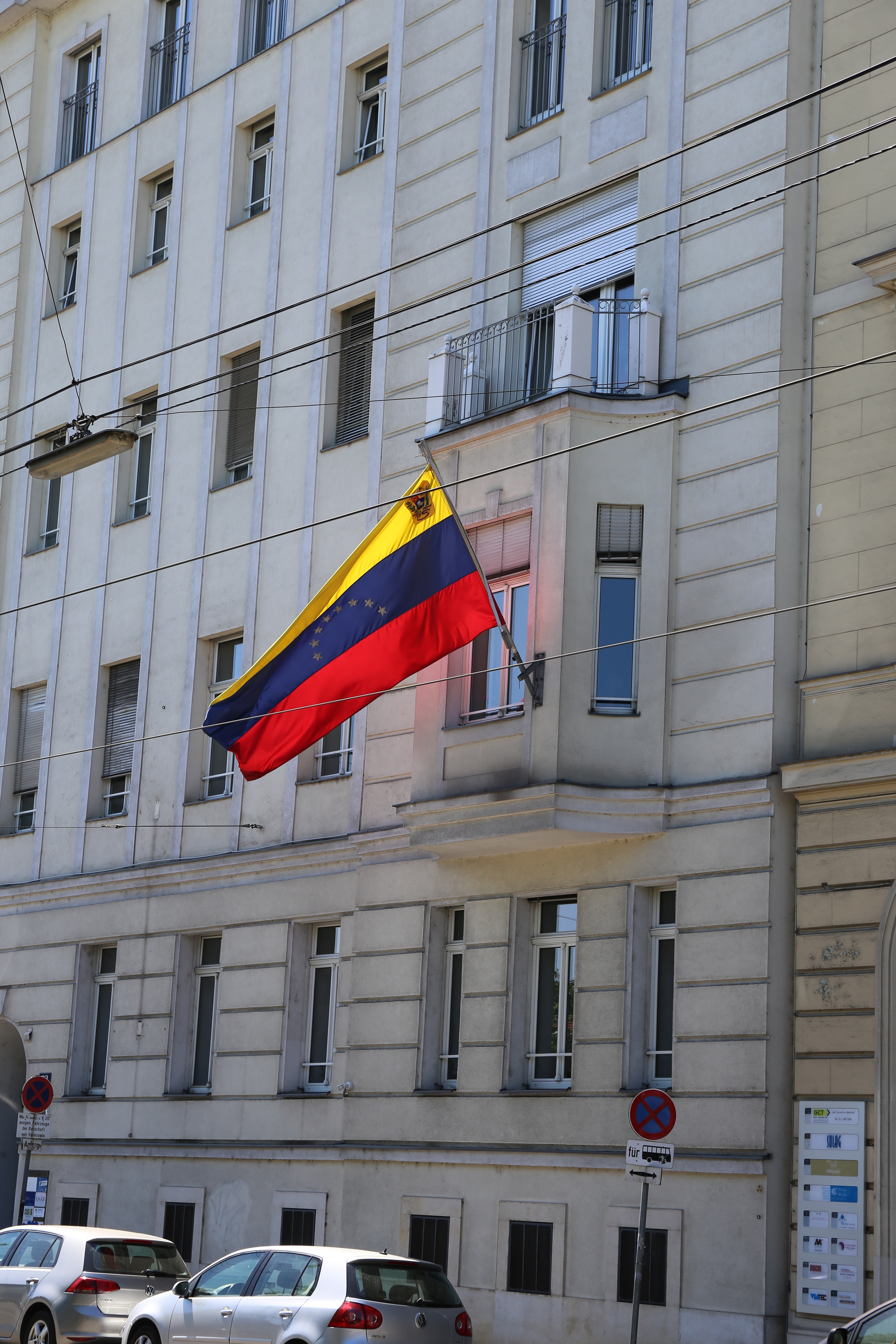
Embassy in Vienna

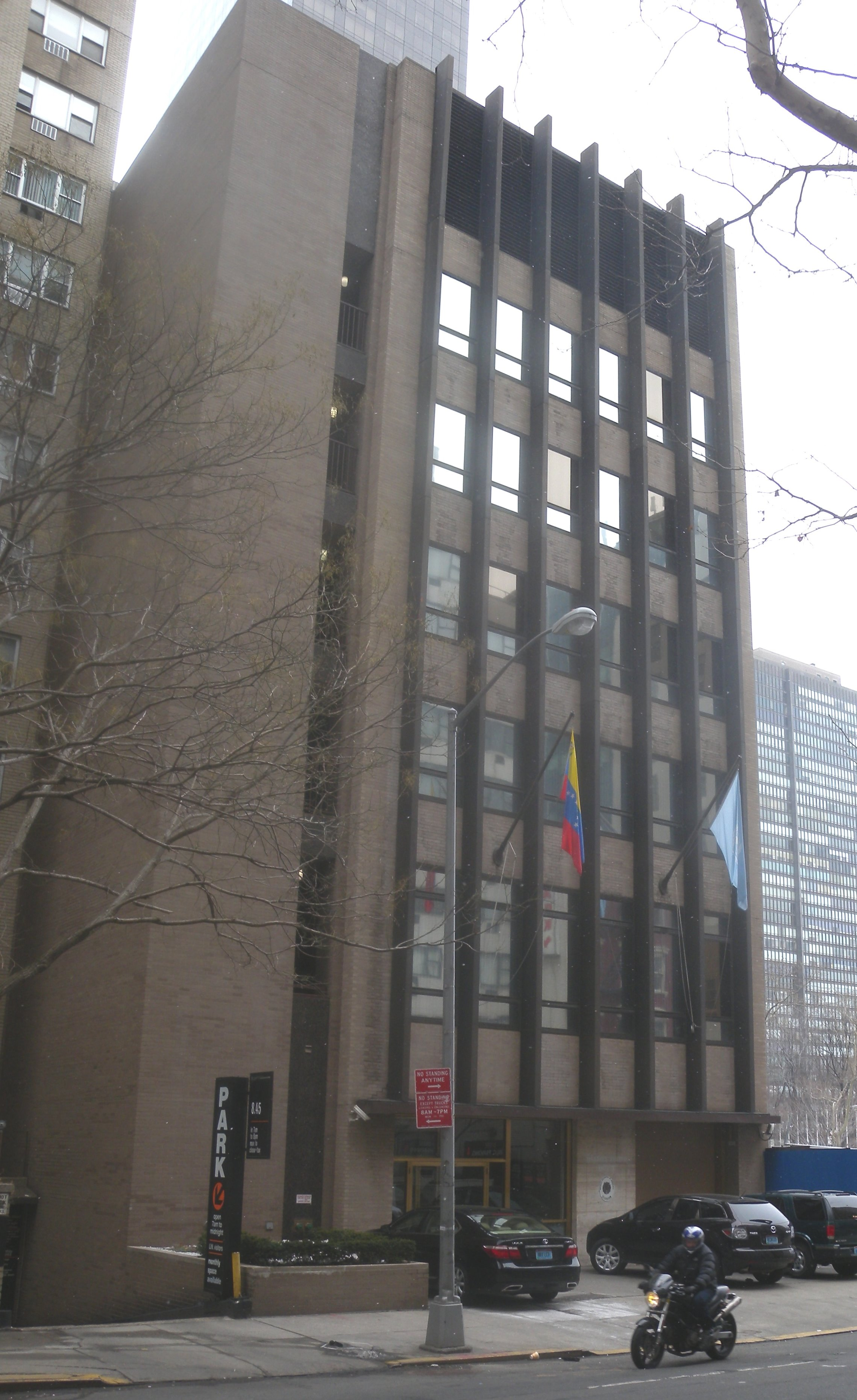
Permanent Mission to the United Nations in New York City

== Closed missions ==
=== Africa ===
Host country	Host city	Mission	Year closed	Ref.
Libya	Tripoli	Embassy (Note: Resident in Tunis, Tunisia)	Unknown	
Sudan	Khartoum	Embassy	2023	

=== Americas ===
Host country	Host city	Mission	Year closed	Ref.
Argentina	Buenos Aires	Embassy	2024	
Canada	Montreal	Consulate-General	2019	
Canada	Toronto	Consulate-General	2019	
Canada	Vancouver	Consulate-General	2019	
Chile	Santiago de Chile	Embassy	2024	
Colombia	Arauca	Consulate-General	2019	
Colombia	Puerto Carreño	Consulate-General	2019	
Costa Rica	San José	Embassy	2024	
Dominican Republic	Santo Domingo	Embassy	2024	
Ecuador	Quito	Embassy	2024	
Ecuador	Guayaquil	Consulate-General	2024	
El Salvador	San Salvador	Embassy	2019	
Guatemala	Guatemala City	Embassy	2020	
Paraguay	Asunción	Embassy	2025	
Peru	Lima	Embassy	2024	
United States	Chicago	Consulate-General	Unknown	
United States	Los Angeles	Consulate-General	2024	
United States	New York City	Consulate-General	2023	
Uruguay	Montevideo	Embassy	2024	

=== Europe ===
Host country	Host city	Mission	Year closed	Ref.
Bulgaria	Sofia	Embassy	2020	
Cyprus	Nicosia	Embassy	Unknown	
Denmark	Copenhagen	Embassy	2018	
Finland	Helsinki	Embassy	2018	
France	Fort-de-France, Martinique	Consulate-General	2019	
Germany	Hamburg	Consulate-General	2019	
Germany	Frankfurt	Consulate-General	Unknown	
Netherlands	Kralendijk, Bonaire	Consulate-General	2019	
Norway	Oslo	Embassy	2025	
Poland	Warsaw	Embassy	2025	
Portugal	Porto	Consulate-General	2019	
Slovenia	Ljubljana	Embassy	Unknown	
Spain	Cádiz	Consulate-General	1985	
Sweden	Stockholm	Embassy	2018	

== See also ==
- Foreign relations of Venezuela
- List of diplomatic missions in Venezuela
- Visa policy of Venezuela
