= Dutch passport =

Passport issued from the Kingdom of the Netherlands

Dutch passport; Nederlands paspoort
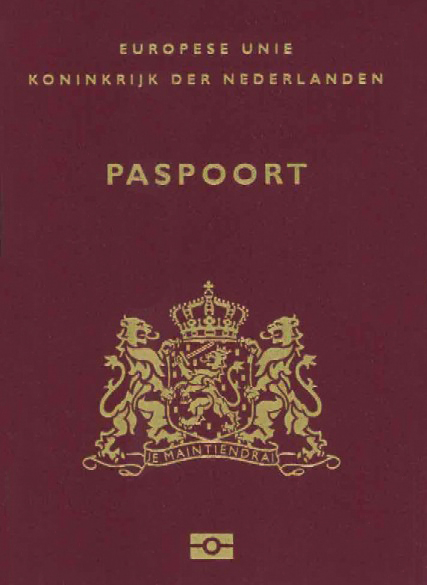
- The front cover of a contemporary Dutch ePassport issued since 2014
- Type: Passport
- Issued by: Ministry of Foreign Affairs
- First issued: 1813 (first passport regulations); 26 August 2006 (biometric passport); 9 March 2014 (current version)
- Eligibility: Citizens of the Kingdom of the Netherlands
- Expiration: 10 years after acquisition for adults and 5 years after acquisition for minors (since 9 March 2014)
- Cost: €83,87 (maximum rate; adults; 34-page; individual municipalities determine the rate; 66-page business passport available for the same price on request.); €63,42 (maximum rate; minors; 34-page; individual municipalities determine the rate.); €139,40 (minors; 34 pages; abroad.); €159,95 (adults; 34 pages; abroad.); US$112,47 (minors; maximum rate, all ages 34-page Aruba, Curaçao, Saint-Martin, Caribbean Netherlands.); US$134,78 (adults; maximum rate, all ages 34-page Aruba, Curaçao, Saint-Martin, Caribbean Netherlands. 66-page business passport available for the same price on request.)

A Dutch passport (Dutch: Nederlands paspoort) is an identity document issued to citizens of the Kingdom of the Netherlands for the purpose of international travel. As the Netherlands only distinguish one category of citizen (Nederlandse (Dutch), NLD), for all countries in the Kingdom, passports are the same for all four countries. The passport also serves as a means of identification as required by the Dutch law since 1 January 2005 for all persons over the age of fourteen. Dutch passports are valid for a period of ten years from issuing date. The passport complies with the rules (EU Council Regulation 2252/04) for European Union passports. Since 26 August 2006 all passports are issued as a biometric passport with an embedded contactless smartcard RFID chip for storing biometric data. Every Dutch citizen is also a citizen of the European Union. The nationality allows for free rights of movement and residence in any of the states of the European Union, European Economic Area, and Switzerland.

== History ==
The first passport regulations in the Netherlands were enacted in 1813, shortly after the country regained its independence from the First French Empire in the Battle of Arnhem (1813).

Around 1950, a new Dutch passport booklet was introduced. This passport, nicknamed the "black rag" (zwarte vod) from the colour of its cover, became increasingly prone to misuse after the 1970s due to its lack of security features. In 1983, the Dutch government decided to develop a new, EU-format machine readable passport, and entered negotiations with the Sdu publishing house and other interested parties. On 6 June 1986, the KEP BV (a partnership between Kodak, Elba (a Schiedam-based printing company) and Philips) was awarded the contract to develop the new passport type, reportedly because the then-state-owned Sdu publishing house was undergoing privatisation. The development of the new passport type was marred with controversy from the beginning, and was the subject of a parliamentary inquiry in 1988. KEP BV was declared insolvent on 27 December 1988 as a result of said controversy, and a new design by the Sdu publishing house was chosen instead.

A new biometric Dutch passport design, designed and manufactured by IDEMIA, is expected to be issued from end-2024.

== Design ==
In line with other EU passports, Dutch passports are burgundy in colour, with the Coat of Arms of the Kingdom of the Netherlands emblazoned on the front cover. The words "EUROPESE UNIE" (European Union) and "KONINKRIJK DER NEDERLANDEN" (Kingdom of the Netherlands) are inscribed above the coat of arms as well as "PASPOORT" (passport), consistent with the design standards as set forth by the European Union. The Model 2011 biometric passport also features the ICAO biometric passport symbol at the bottom of the cover. The regular passport contains 34 pages, 28 of which may be used for visas. Each chip contains a digital record of the person's fingerprints.

=== Identity Information Page ===
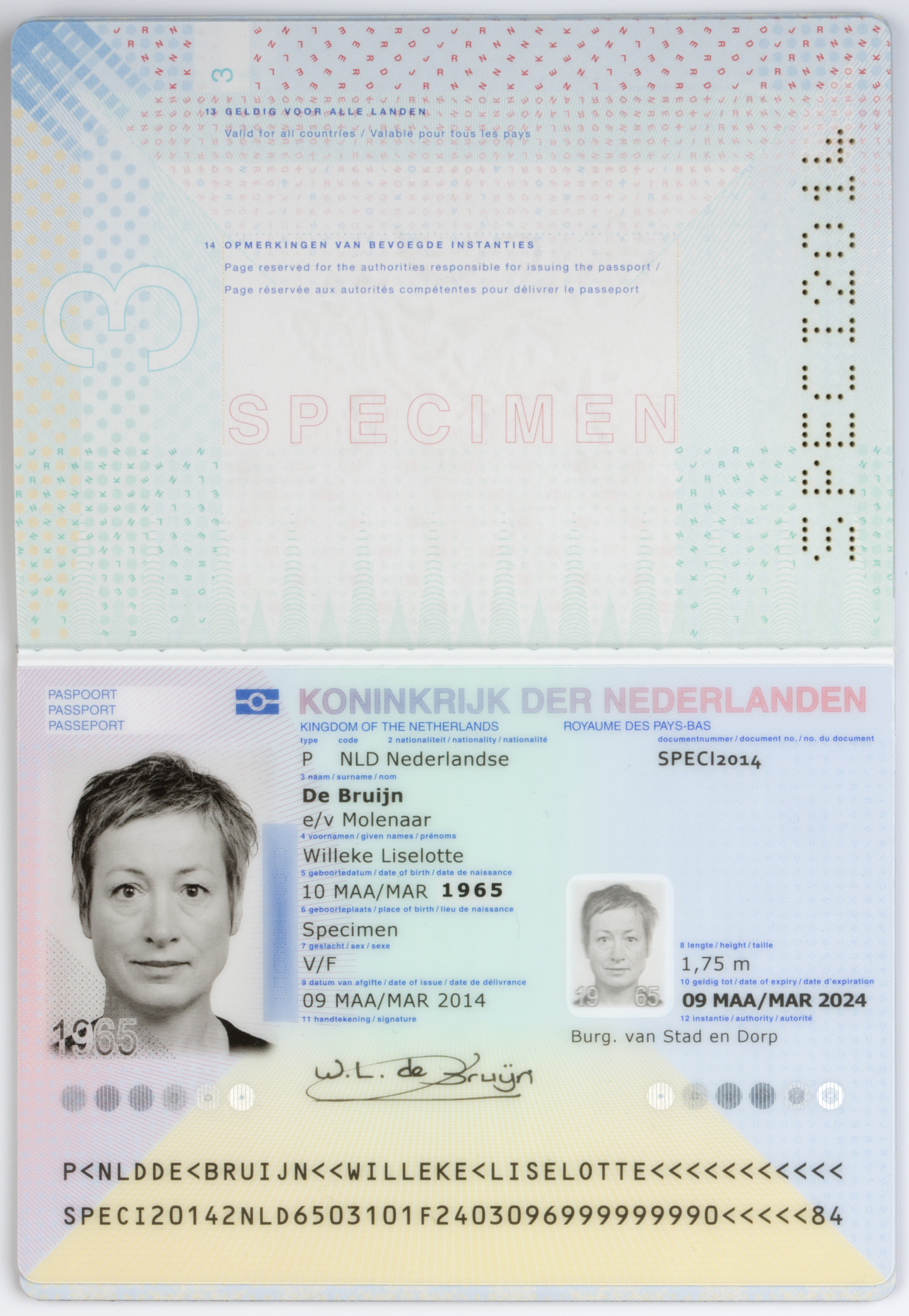
Specimen of the identity information page issued since 9 March 2014

The Dutch passport includes the following data on the identity information page:

- (1) Personal Identification Number (on the back on the identity information page)
- Photo of passport Holder
- Type (P)
- Code (NLD)
- (2) Nationality (Nederlandse)
- Document no.
- (3) Surname
- (4) Given names
- (5) Date of birth
- (6) Place of birth
- (7) Sex
- (8) Height
- (9) Date of issue
- (10) Date of expiry
- (11) Signature (of holder)
- (12) Issuing Authority (If issued in The Netherlands, the Mayor of the municipality of residence. If issued by a diplomatic post, the Minister of Foreign Affairs

The information page ends with the Machine Readable Zone starting with P<NLD.

=== Languages ===
For each item in the passport captions are provided in Dutch, English and French. These captions are numbered and translations into the twenty-three official languages of the European Union are given on the last two pages of the passport.

=== Passport note ===
The Dutch passport contains on its inside cover in Dutch, English and French the words:

In naam van Zijne Majesteit de Koning der Nederlanden, Prins van Oranje-Nassau, enz. enz. enz., verzoekt de Minister van Buitenlandse Zaken alle overheden van bevriende staten aan de houder van dit paspoort vrije en ongehinderde doorgang te verlenen alsmede alle hulp en bijstand te verschaffen

In the name of His Majesty the King of the Netherlands, Prince of Orange-Nassau, etc. etc. etc., the Minister of Foreign Affairs requests all authorities of friendly powers to allow the bearer of the present passport to pass freely without let or hindrance and to afford the bearer every assistance and protection which may be necessary.

The term etc. etc. etc. reflects the large number of other titles the King holds and which are not normally mentioned.

== Validity ==
The regular and business passports are valid for a ten-year period from date of issue (five years for minors). A second passport is valid for a period of two years from date of issue. Emergency passports are valid for the duration of the journey, but no longer than a period of one year from date of issue. Foreigners passports are valid for the same period as the corresponding residence permit is valid.

== Types of passports ==
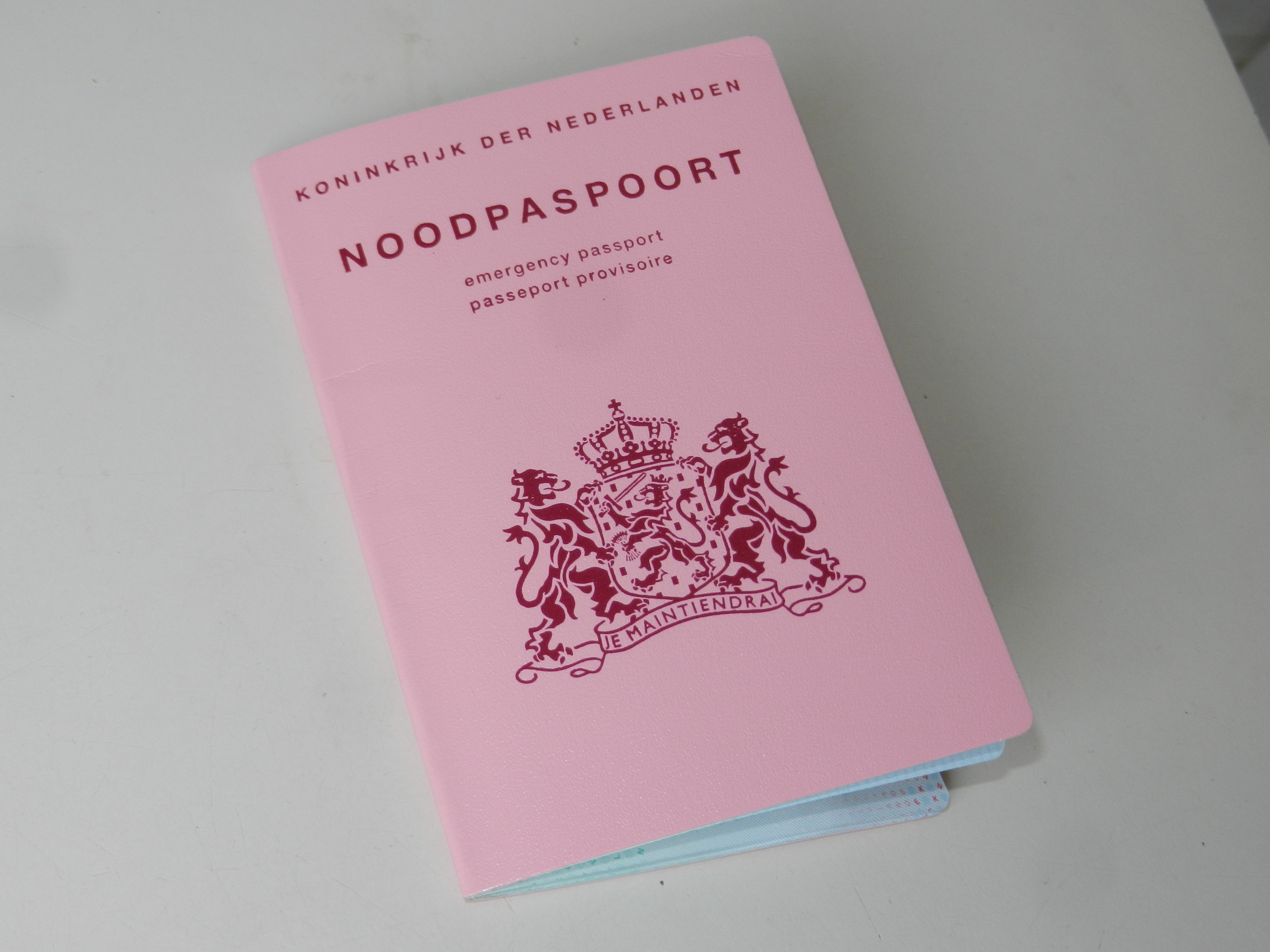
Dutch emergency passport

- Regular passport (Dutch: Nationaal paspoort) issued for holiday and business travels and for identification required by Dutch law. The passport contains 34 pages and is valid for a period of ten years from issuing date.
- Second passport (Dutch: Tweede paspoort) issued for business purposes only to those citizens travelling frequently and experiencing problems when entering countries because of visa (stamps) present in the regular passport or because the regular passport is in process for obtaining other visa by a foreign embassy. The passport is valid for a period of two years from date of issue.
- Business passport (Dutch: Zakenpaspoort) issued with additional pages that may be used for visa. The business passport contains 66 pages and is valid for a period of ten years from issuing date.
- Diplomatic passport (Dutch: Diplomatiek paspoort) issued to people representing the Dutch government on official business and offering diplomatic immunity as defined by the Vienna Convention on Diplomatic Relations. The passport contains 66 pages.
- Service passport (Dutch: Dienstpaspoort) issued to people representing the Dutch government on official business, but without offering diplomatic immunity. The passport contains 66 pages.
- Emergency passport (pink cover) (Dutch: Noodpaspoort) issued either by the Royal Marechaussee or a Dutch representative abroad to Dutch citizens who are unable to obtain a proper passport in time for travel, strict rules apply.
- Alien's passport (green cover) (Dutch: Vreemdelingenpaspoort) issued for travelling purposes to non-Dutch residents of the Netherlands who are unable to obtain a passport from their own government.
- Laissez-Passer (blue cover) emergency travel document with 8 pages containing handwritten information.

== Visa free travel ==
Visa requirements for Dutch citizens Netherlands Freedom of movement Visa not required / ESTA / eTA / eVisitor Visa on arrival eVisa Visa available both on arrival or online Visa required prior to arrival

Visa requirements for Dutch citizens are administrative entry restrictions by the authorities of other states placed on citizens of the Netherlands. As of 21 September 2022, Dutch citizens had visa-free or visa on arrival access to 188 countries and territories, ranking the Dutch passport 5th in the world (tied with the passports of Austria, Denmark, and Sweden) according to the Henley Passport Index. Although a passport is often used for travel, it is the nationality rather than the passport that visa-free travel is based on.

== Gallery of historic images ==
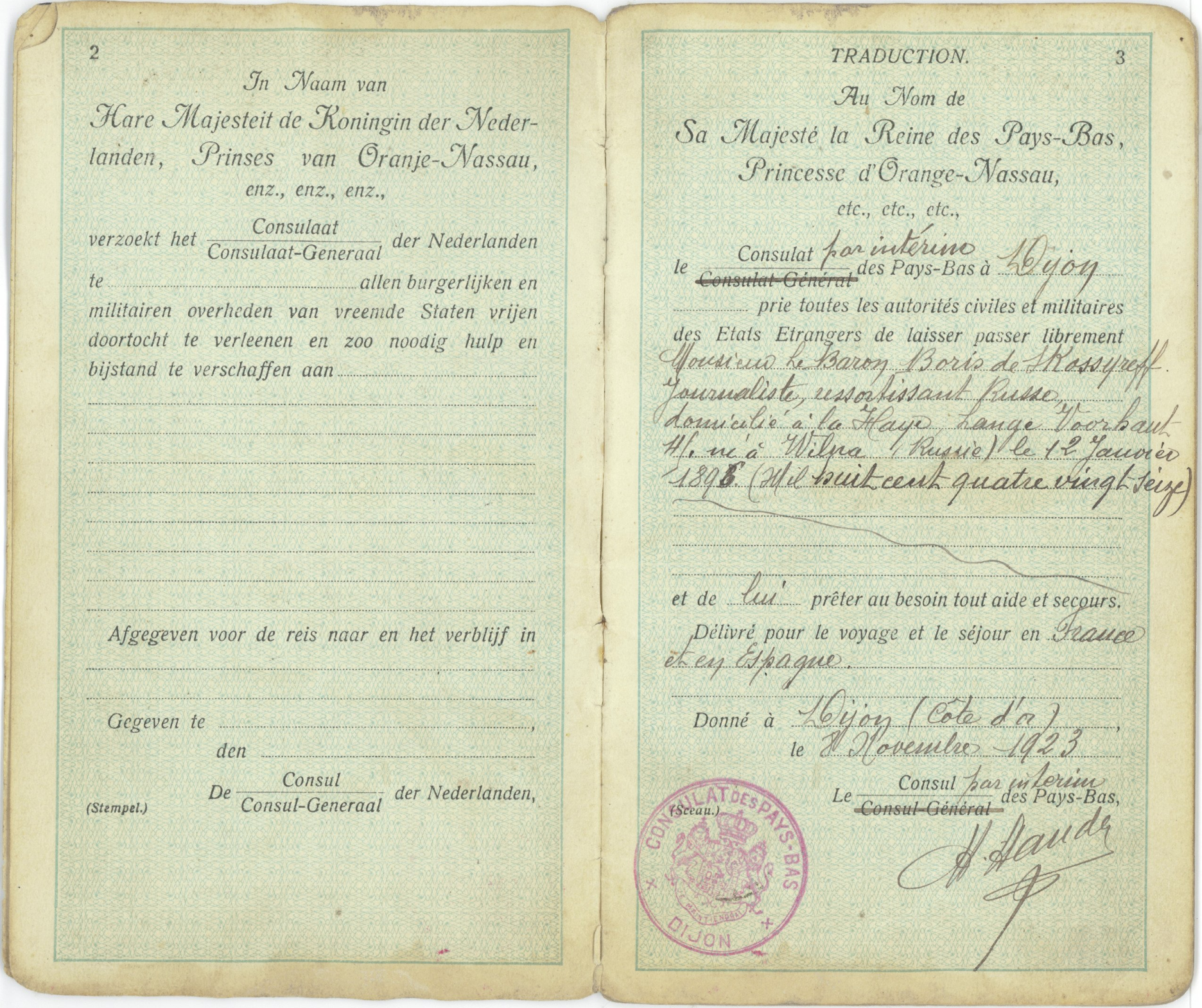
Dutch passport issued to Boris Skossyreff in 1923

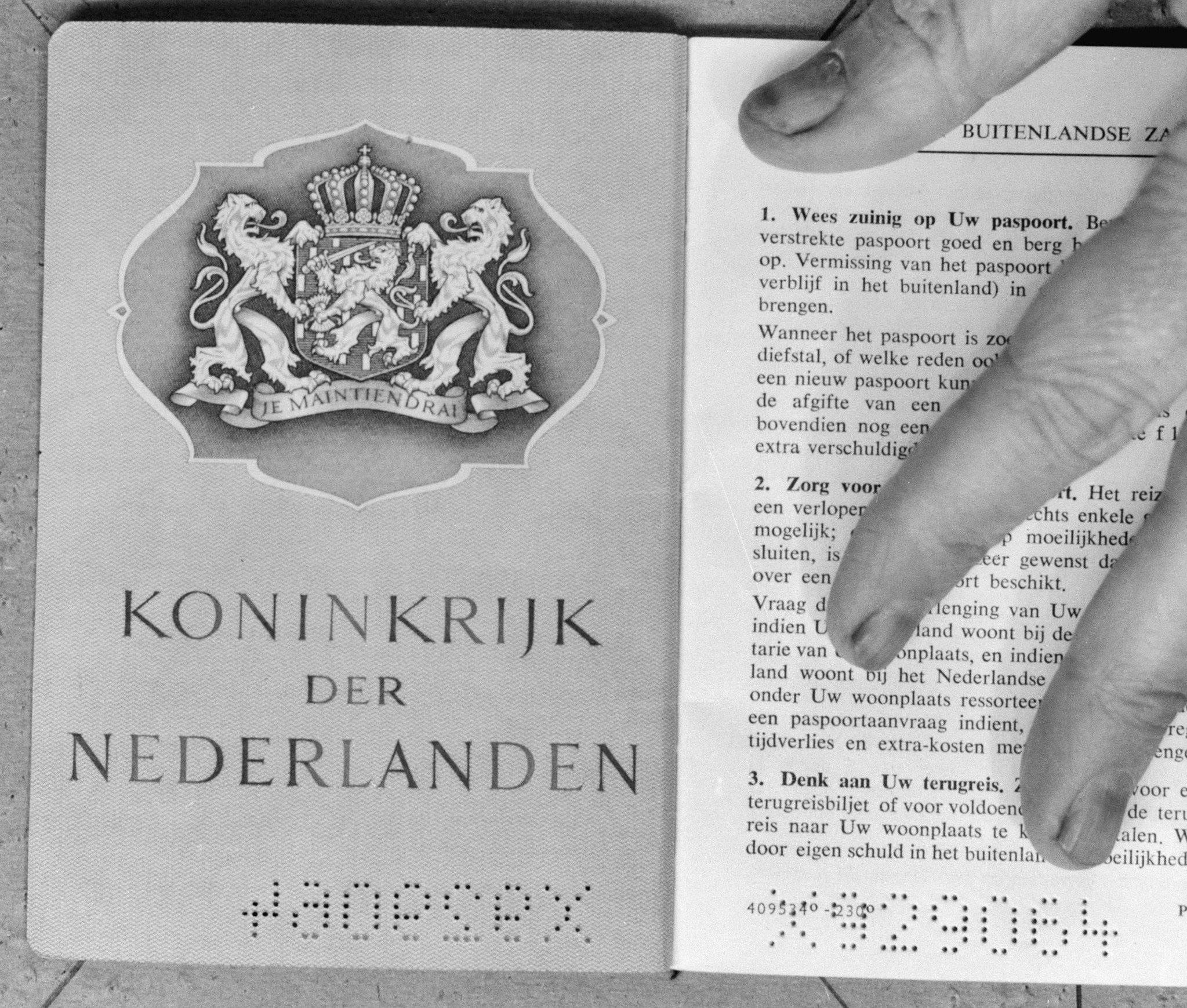
Inner cover page of a "zwarte vod" Dutch passport, issued in 1967

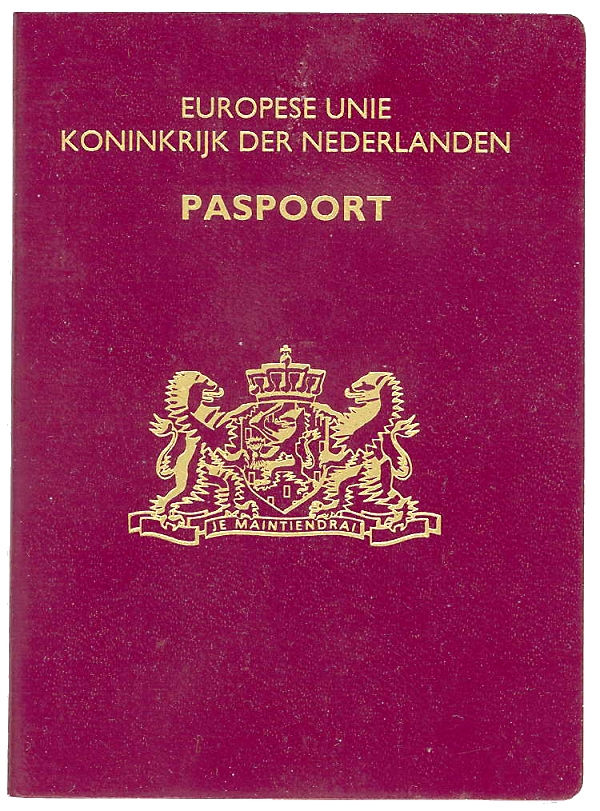
Dutch machine-readable passport cover as issued 2003–06

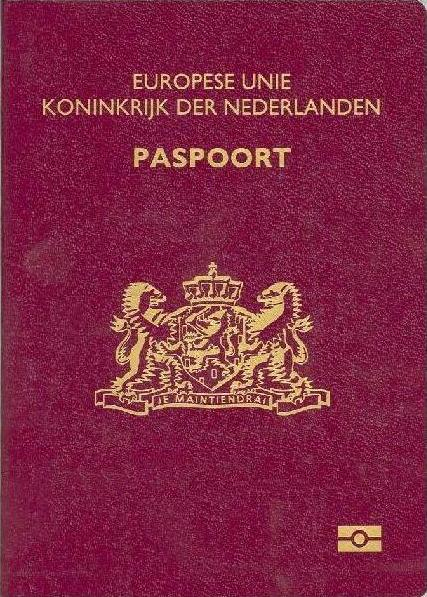
Dutch passport cover as issued 2006 biometric

== See also ==
- Visa requirements for Dutch citizens
- Passports of the European Union
- Dutch identity card
- Dutch nationality law
- Dutch passport information on Public Register of Travel and Identity Documents Online
- Visa policy of the Schengen Area
- Visa policy of the Kingdom of the Netherlands in the Caribbean
