= Visa requirements for Dutch citizens =

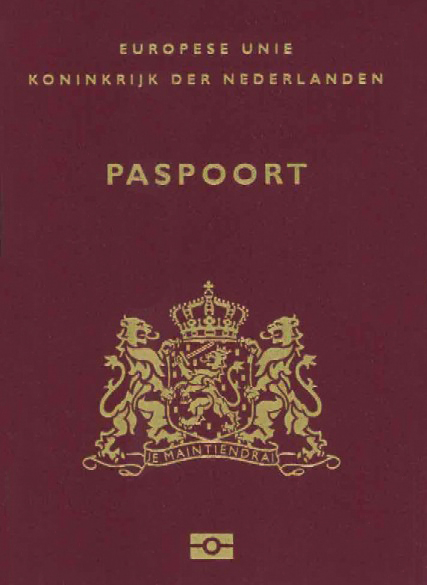
A Dutch passport, one of the travel documents for Dutch citizens

Visa requirements for Dutch citizens are administrative entry restrictions by the authorities of other states placed on citizens of the Netherlands, the joint nationality of the four countries within the Kingdom of the Netherlands.

As of 2026, Dutch citizens had visa-free or visa on arrival access to 185 countries and territories, ranking the Dutch passport 4th in the world according to the Henley Passport Index.

== Visa requirements map ==
Visa requirements for Dutch citizens holding ordinary passports Netherlands Freedom of movement Visa not required / ESTA / eTA / eVisitor Visa on arrival eVisa Visa available both on arrival or online Visa required

== Visa requirements ==
Country	Visa requirement	Allowed stay	Notes (excluding departure fees)
Afghanistan	eVisa		The Dutch government advises its citizens not to travel to Afghanistan due to the security situation in the country.; Visa is not required in case born in Afghanistan or can proof that one of their parents is a national of Afghanistan or born in Afghanistan.; e-Visa : Visitors must arrive at Kabul International (KBL).
Albania	Visa not required	90 days	ID card valid.
Algeria	Visa required		
Andorra	Visa not required		
Angola	Visa not required	30 days	30 days per trip, but no more than 90 days within any 1 calendar year for tourism purposes only.; Visitors must have a return/onward ticket and a hotel reservation confirmation.; An International Certificate of Vaccination is required.
Antigua and Barbuda	Visa not required	6 months	
Argentina	Visa not required	90 days	
Armenia	Visa not required	180 days	
Australia	eVisitor or Electronic Travel Authority	90 days	90 days on each visit in 12-month period if granted.
Austria	Visa not required		Freedom of movement.; ID card valid.
Azerbaijan	eVisa	30 days	
Bahamas	Visa not required	8 months	
Bahrain	eVisa / Visa on arrival	14 days	
Bangladesh	Visa on arrival	30 days	
Barbados	Visa not required	3 months	
Belarus	Visa not required	30 days	Visa-free until 31 December 2026.
Belgium	Visa not required		Freedom of movement.; ID card valid.
Belize	Visa not required	30 days	
Benin	eVisa	30 days	Must have an international vaccination certificate.
Bhutan	eVisa		Pre-approved visa can be picked up on arrival.
Bolivia	Visa not required	90 days	
Bosnia and Herzegovina	Visa not required	90 days	90 days within any 6-month period.; ID card valid.
Botswana	Visa not required	90 days	
Brazil	Visa not required	90 days	90 days within any 180 day period.
Brunei	Visa not required	90 days	
Bulgaria	Visa not required		Freedom of movement.; ID card valid.
Burkina Faso	eVisa	1 month	The Dutch government advises its citizens not to travel to Burkina Faso due to the political and security situation in the country.
Burundi	Online visa / Visa on arrival	1 month	
Cambodia	eVisa / Visa on arrival	30 days	Visa is also obtainable online.
Cameroon	eVisa		Pre-approved visa can be picked up on arrival.
Canada	eTA / Visa not required	6 months	eTA required if arriving by air.
Cape Verde	Visa not required	30 days	Airport security tax of CVE 3400 charged for all inbound international flights.; Online registration required, preferably at least 5 days before departure.
Central African Republic	Visa required		The Dutch government advises its citizens not to travel to Central African Republic due to the security situation in the country.
Chad	eVisa	90 days	Must apply at least 7 days before arrival but maximum 90 days before arrival.
Chile	Visa not required	90 days	
China	Visa not required	30 days	Visa-free from December 1, 2023 to December 31, 2026.; 240-hour (10-day) visa-free transit to a third country or region (including Hong Kong, Macau or Taiwan) using any mode of transport. Must have a confirmed onward ticket/itinerary, and enter through 1 of 64 approved ports.; During which, may freely travel within the 24 provinces permitted for visa-free transit and engage in tourism, business, and visits.; 24-hour visa-free transit to a third country or region (including Hong Kong, Macau, and Taiwan), is available at most international airports, without leaving the airport.; Travellers who need to leave the airport may obtain a temporary entry permit from immigration.; 5-day port visa (Visa on Arrival) for Shenzhen if arriving at designated ports of entry from Hong Kong by land or sea, for stays within Shenzhen.; 3-day port visa (Visa on Arrival) if arriving in Zhuhai or Xiamen at designated ports of entry, for stays within the respective city.; 15-day visa-free entry for cruise ship passengers in tour groups, if arriving at any cruise port along China's coastline, including but not limited to Tianjin; Dalian; Shanghai; Lianyungang; Wenzhou; Zhoushan; Xiamen; Qingdao; Guangzhou; Shenzhen; Beihai; Haikou; Sanya. May further travel inland to all regions of coastal provinces (and equivalents) and Beijing.; May apply for a port visa (Visa on Arrival) if travelling for an urgent, qualified reason. Prior clearance for port visa is highly recommended or may be denied boarding by airlines.; Holders of ordinary passports, who are part of a journey arranged by a tour agency officially recognised in Hainan, can access China through the border entry points accessible to foreign visitors in Hainan without the need for a Chinese visa. They are permitted to stay for a maximum duration of 30 days.
Colombia	Visa not required	90 days	90 days - extendable up to 180-days stay within a one-year period.
Comoros	Visa on arrival	45 days	
Republic of the Congo	Visa required		
Democratic Republic of the Congo	eVisa	7 days	
Costa Rica	Visa not required	90 days	
Côte d'Ivoire	eVisa	3 months	e-Visa holders must arrive via Port Bouet Airport.
Croatia	Visa not required		Freedom of movement; ID card valid
Cuba	eVisa	90 days	Can be extended up to 90 days with a fee.
Cyprus	Visa not required		Freedom of movement; ID card valid
Czech Republic	Visa not required		Freedom of movement; ID card valid
Denmark	Visa not required		Freedom of movement (DK); ID card valid
Djibouti	eVisa	90 days	
Dominica	Visa not required	90 days	90 days within any 180 day period.
Dominican Republic	Visa not required	90 days	Tourist card required.
Ecuador	Visa not required	90 days	
Egypt	eVisa / Visa on arrival	30 days	
El Salvador	Visa not required	3 months	
Equatorial Guinea	eVisa		e-Visa holders must arrive via Malabo International Airport.
Eritrea	Visa required		Pre-approved visa can be picked up on arrival.
Estonia	Visa not required		Freedom of movement; ID card valid
Eswatini	Visa not required	30 days	
Ethiopia	eVisa / Visa on arrival	up to 90 days	Visa on arrival is obtainable only at Addis Ababa Bole International Airport.; e-Visa holders must arrive via Addis Ababa Bole International Airport.; e-Visa is available for 30 or 90 days.
Fiji	Visa not required	4 months	
Finland	Visa not required		Freedom of movement; ID card valid
France and territories	Visa not required		Freedom of movement (in Regions of France); ID card valid
Gabon	eVisa	90 days	e-Visa holders must arrive via Libreville International Airport.
Gambia	Visa not required	90 days	
Georgia	Visa not required	1 year	ID card valid
Germany	Visa not required		Freedom of movement; ID card valid
Ghana	Visa required		Pre-approved visa can be picked up on arrival.
Greece	Visa not required		Freedom of movement; ID card valid
Grenada	Visa not required	3 months	
Guatemala	Visa not required	90 days	
Guinea	eVisa	90 days	
Guinea-Bissau	Visa on arrival		
Guyana	Visa not required	3 months	
Haiti	Visa not required	90 days	The Dutch government advises its citizens not to travel to Haiti due to the volatile situation in the country.
Honduras	Visa not required	3 months	
Hungary	Visa not required		Freedom of movement; ID card valid
Iceland	Visa not required		Freedom of movement; ID card valid
India	eVisa	30 days	e-Visa holders must arrive via 32 designated airports (Note: Ahmedabad; Amritsar; Bagdogra; Bengaluru; Bhubaneswar; Chandigarh; Chennai; Coimbatore; Delhi; Gaya; Goa-Dabolim; Goa-Manohar; Guwahati; Hyderabad; Indore; Jaipur; Kannur; Kochi; Kolkata; Kozhikode; Lucknow; Madurai; Mangaluru; Mumbai; Nagpur; Port Blair; Pune; Surat; Thiruvananthapuram; Tiruchirappalli; Varanasi; Visakhapatnam) or 5 designated seaports. (Note: Chennai; Cochin; Mormugao (Goa); Mumbai; Mangalore); An Indian e-Tourist Visa may only be obtained twice within 1 calendar year.; Foreigners of Pakistani origin or who hold a Pakistani Passport are not eligible for an e-Visa. Foreigners who are not Pakistani nationals, but whose parents or grandparents (either paternal or maternal) were born in, or were permanent residents in Pakistan, are also not eligible for an e-Visa.
Indonesia	e-VOA / Visa on arrival	30 days	
Iran	eVisa	30 days	The Dutch government advises its citizens not to travel to Iran due to the security situation in the country. Dutch citizens in Iran are likely to face arbitrary detention by the Iranian authorities.
Iraq	eVisa	30 days	Authorities in Iraq have decided to remove the visa-on-arrival requirement for nationals of the European Union and several other countries, requiring them to now apply for an e-visa to enter Iraq through the official platform.; Visa on arrival or eVisa for up to 30 days for travel to Iraqi Kurdistan.; The Dutch government advises its citizens not to travel to Iraq due to the high threat of terrorist attacks in the country. The only exception is the Kurdish Autonomous Region, whereas the Dutch government advises its citizens to travel there only if necessary. Though this was revised after the Twelve-Day War with the Dutch government advising its citizens not to travel to the entirety of Iraq
Ireland	Visa not required		Freedom of movement; ID card valid
Israel	ETA-IL	3 months	
Italy	Visa not required		Freedom of movement; ID card valid
Jamaica	Visa not required	90 days	
Japan	Visa not required	90 days	
Jordan	eVisa / Visa on arrival		Visa can be obtained upon arrival, it will cost a total of 40 JOD, obtainable at most international ports of entry and land border crossings (except King Hussein/Allenby Bridge).
Kazakhstan	Visa not required	30 days	
Kenya	Electronic Travel Authorisation	90 days	Applications can be submitted up to 90 days prior to travel and must be submitted at least 3 days in advance.; eTA fee is 32.50 USD.; Proof of reservation at the hotel where visitors plan to stay is required (if staying with friends, an invitation letter is also acceptable).; Yellow fever vaccination certificate is required if coming from endemic countries.
Kiribati	Visa not required	90 days	90 days within any 180 day period.
North Korea	Visa required		
South Korea	Visa not required	90 days	The validity period of a K-ETA is 3 years from the date of approval. Dutch citizens are exempt from applying for a K-ETA until the end of 2026.
Kosovo	Visa not required	90 days	ID card valid.
Kuwait	eVisa / Visa on arrival	3 months	
Kyrgyzstan	Visa not required	60 days	
Laos	eVisa / Visa on arrival	30 days	18 (Note: Savannakhet Airport; Lanetoui - Mengkang (China); Meuangmom - Wan Pong (Myanmar); Banvang - Ban Khok Phai (Thailand); Namngeun - Huay Kon (Thailand); Paksan - Bueng Kan (Thailand); Paktaphan - Pak Saeng (Thailand); Pangmon - Ban Huak (Thailand); Phoudou (Thailand); Dak ta ock - Nam Giang (Vietnam); La Lai (Vietnam); Namkan (Vietnam); Namphao - Cau Treo (Vietnam); Namsoy - Na Meo (Vietnam); Naphao - Cha Lo (Vietnam); Pahang - Long Sap (Vietnam); Panghok - Tây Trang (Vietnam); Phoukeua - Bo Y (Vietnam)) of the 33 border crossings are only open to regular visa holders.; e-Visa may be used to enter Laos through the Luang Prabang, Pakse and Vientiane international airports, 3 Thai-Lao Friendship Bridges (Note: Vientiane (Friendship Bridge 1); Savannakhet (Friendship Bridge 2); Bokeo (Friendship Bridge 4)), in Boten (road and railroad), and in Vientiane (at Khamsavath railway station).; Visa on arrival is available at the Luang Prabang, Pakse and Vientiane international airports, 4 Thai-Lao Friendship Bridges (Note: Vientiane (Friendship Bridge 1); Savannakhet (Friendship Bridge 2); Khammouane (Friendship Bridge 3); Bokeo (Friendship Bridge 4)) and 7 border crossings. (Note: Nongnokkheane - Trapeang Kriel (Cambodia); Boten - Bo han (China); Golden Triangle/Samliemkham (Thailand); Khamsavath railway station (Thailand); Namheuang - Ban Na Kraseng (Thailand); Vang tao - Chongmek (Thailand); Dansavan - Lao Bảo (Vietnam))
Latvia	Visa not required		Freedom of movement; ID card valid
Lebanon	Free visa on arrival	1 month	1 month extendable for 2 additional months; Granted free of charge at Beirut International Airport or any other port of entry if there is no Israeli visa or seal, holding a telephone number, an address in Lebanon, and a non refundable return or circle trip ticket.
Lesotho	Visa not required	14 days	
Liberia	eVisa	90 days	The Liberia Visa on Arrival (VoA) allows travelers to obtain a Visa upon arrival in Liberia by plane. Travelers must pre-apply for the visa online.
Libya	eVisa		The Dutch government advises its citizens not to travel to Libya due to the volatile situation in the country.
Liechtenstein	Visa not required		Freedom of movement.; ID card valid.
Lithuania	Visa not required		Freedom of movement.; ID card valid.
Luxembourg	Visa not required		Freedom of movement.; ID card valid.
Madagascar	eVisa / Visa on arrival	90 days	
Malawi	eVisa / Visa on arrival	30 days	
Malaysia	Visa not required	3 months	
Maldives	Free visa on arrival	30 days	
Mali	Visa required		The Dutch government advises its citizens not to travel to Mali due to the high risk of terrorist attacks and violence against Westerners throughout the country.
Malta	Visa not required		Freedom of movement; ID card valid
Marshall Islands	Visa not required	90 days	90 days within any 180 day period.
Mauritania	eVisa	30 days	An eVisa is mandatory before travel.
Mauritius	Visa not required	90 days	
Mexico	Visa not required	180 days	
Micronesia	Visa not required	90 days	90 days within any 180 day period.
Moldova	Visa not required	90 days	90 days within any 180 day period.; ID card valid.
Monaco	Visa not required		ID card valid.
Mongolia	Visa not required	30 days	The Ministry of Foreign Affairs of Mongolia has exempted visas for 34 countries from January 2023 to December 2026.
Montenegro	Visa not required	90 days	ID card valid for 30 days.
Morocco	Visa not required	90 days	
Mozambique	Visa not required	30 days	Travelers must register on the e-Visa platform at least 48 hours prior to travel and pay a processing fee of 650 MT.
Myanmar	eVisa	28 days	e-Visa holders must arrive via Yangon, Nay Pyi Taw or Mandalay airports or via land border crossings with Thailand — Tachileik, Myawaddy and Kawthaung or India — Rih Khaw Dar and Tamu.; e-Visa available for both tourism (allowed stay is 28 days) or business (allowed stay is 70 days) purposes.
Namibia	eVisa / Visa on arrival	3 months	Can be obtained online or on arrival for a fee of N$1,600 (approximately €82 / US$88).
Nauru	Visa required		
Nepal	Online Visa / Visa on arrival	90 days	
New Zealand and territories	Electronic Travel Authority	3 months	May enter using eGate.; International Visitor Conservation and Tourism Levy must be paid upon requesting an Electronic Travel Authority.; Holders of an Australian Permanent Resident Visa or Resident Return Visa may be granted a New Zealand Resident Visa on arrival permitting indefinite stay (pursuant to the Trans-Tasman Travel Arrangement), subject to meeting character requirements and obtaining an Electronic Travel Authority prior to departure. Such travellers are not required to pay the International Visitor Conservation and Tourism Levy.
Nicaragua	Visa not required	90 days	
Niger	Visa required		The Dutch government advises its citizens not to travel to Niger due to the security situation in the country. Kidnappings and temporary seizure of passports by Nigerien authorities have been reported.
Nigeria	eVisa	90 days	Pre-approved visa can be picked up on arrival.
North Macedonia	Visa not required	90 days	ID card valid.
Norway	Visa not required		Freedom of movement.; ID card valid.
Oman	Visa not required / eVisa	14 days / 30 days	No need of visa for less than 14 days.
Pakistan	eVisa	90 days	
Palau	Visa not required	90 days	90 days within any 180 day period.
Panama	Visa not required	90 days	
Papua New Guinea	eVisa	60 days	Available at Gurney Airport (Alotau), Mount Hagen Airport, Port Moresby Airport and Tokua Airport (Rabaul).
Paraguay	Visa not required	90 days	
Peru	Visa not required	90 days	90 days within any 6-month period.
Philippines	Visa not required	30 days	A single or multiple entry eVisa for stays of up to 59 days is also available.
Poland	Visa not required		Freedom of movement.; ID card valid.
Portugal	Visa not required		Freedom of movement.; ID card valid.
Qatar	Visa not required	90 days	
Romania	Visa not required		Freedom of movement.; ID card valid.
Russia	eVisa	16 days	
Rwanda	eVisa / Visa on arrival	30 days	
Saint Kitts and Nevis	Visa not required	3 months	
Saint Lucia	Visa not required	90 days	90 days within any 180 day period.
Saint Vincent and the Grenadines	Visa not required	90 days	90 days within any 180 day period.
Samoa	Visa not required	90 days	90 days within any 180 day period.
San Marino	Visa not required		ID card valid.
São Tomé and Príncipe	Visa not required	15 days	
Saudi Arabia	eVisa / Visa on arrival	90 days	
Senegal	Visa not required	90 days	
Serbia	Visa not required	90 days	90 days within any 6-month period.; ID card valid.
Seychelles	Visa not required	3 months	
Sierra Leone	eVisa / Visa on arrival	3 months / 30 days	
Singapore	Visa not required	90 days	
Slovakia	Visa not required		Freedom of movement.; ID card valid.
Slovenia	Visa not required		Freedom of movement.; ID card valid.
Solomon Islands	Visa not required	90 days	90 days within any 180 day period.
Somalia	eVisa	30 days	All visitors must have an approved Electronic Visa (eTAS) before the start of their journey; The Dutch government advises its citizens not to travel to Somalia due to the security situation in the country. Attacks and armed conflicts have been reported. The only exceptions are the cities of Berbera and Hargeisa in Somaliland whereas the Dutch government advises its citizens to travel to those cities only if necessary.
South Africa	Visa not required	90 days	
South Sudan	eVisa		Obtainable online.; Printed visa authorization must be presented at the time of travel.; The Dutch government advises its citizens not to travel to South Sudan due to the unstable and deterioration of the security situation in the country. Dutch citizens in South Sudan are advised to leave if it is safe to do so.
Spain	Visa not required		Freedom of movement.; ID card valid.
Sri Lanka	eVisa / Visa on arrival	60 days / 30 days	Sri Lanka introduced an ETA valid for 30 days.
Sudan	Visa required		The Dutch government advises its citizens not to travel to Sudan due to the ongoing conflict in the country.; Khartoum International Airport is closed.
Suriname	Visa not required	90 days	An entrance fee of USD 50 or EUR 50 must be paid online prior to arrival.; Multiple entry e-Visa is also available.
Sweden	Visa not required		Freedom of movement; ID card valid
Switzerland	Visa not required		Freedom of movement; ID card valid
Syria	eVisa		The Dutch government advises its citizens not to travel to Syria due to the security situation and multiple conflicts in the country.
Tajikistan	Visa not required	30 days	At Dushanbe International Airport.; Visa also available online.; e-Visa holders can enter through all border points.
Tanzania	eVisa / Visa on arrival	90 days	
Thailand	Visa not required	60 days	Maximum two visits annually if not arriving by air.
Timor-Leste	Visa not required	90 days	90 days within any 180 day period.
Togo	eVisa	15 days	
Tonga	Visa not required	90 days	90 days within any 180 day period.
Trinidad and Tobago	Visa not required	90 days	90 days within any 180 day period.
Tunisia	Visa not required	90 days	
Turkey	Visa not required	90 days	90 days within 180 day period (as of 2 March 2020).; ID card valid
Turkmenistan	eVisa		Available online via the State Migration Service of Turkmenistan since 1 October 2026.; Independent tourist entry remains restricted; travel through a licensed agency is typically required.
Tuvalu	Visa not required	90 days	90 days within any 180 day period.
Uganda	eVisa	3 months	
Ukraine	Visa not required	90 days	90 days within any 180 day period.; The Dutch government advises its citizens not to travel to Ukraine due to Russia's aggression towards Ukraine.
United Arab Emirates	Visa not required	90 days	90 days within any 180 day period.
United Kingdom	Electronic Travel Authorisation	6 months	An ETA is required to travel to the United Kingdom, including Northern Ireland.
United States	Visa Waiver Program	90 days	ESTA is valid for 2 years from the date of issuance.; ESTA is also required when entering the country by cruise ship or land.; A Form I-94 is required for entry into the United States by land. It carries a $30 fee and can be obtained either online or upon arrival.; Visa required for nationals of VWP countries who have travelled or been present in Iran, Iraq, Libya, North Korea, Somalia, Sudan, Syria or Yemen at any time on or after 1 March 2011 or Cuba at any time on or after 12 January 2021, or nationals of VWP countries who are also nationals of Iran, Iraq, North Korea, Sudan or Syria. Exceptions apply if the travel was in military or diplomatic service of the VWP country.
Uruguay	Visa not required	90 days	
Uzbekistan	Visa not required	30 days	
Vanuatu	Visa not required	90 days	90 days within any 180 day period.
Vatican City	Visa not required		ID card valid.
Venezuela	Visa not required	90 days	Entry to Venezuela not possible through Aruba, Curaçao or Bonaire.
Vietnam	Visa not required	45 days	e-Visa is valid for 90 days and multiple entry.
Yemen	Visa required		The Dutch government advises its citizens not to travel to Yemen due to the ongoing Yemeni civil war. Dutch citizens in Yemen are advised to leave if safe to do so.
Zambia	Visa not required	30 days	Also eligible for a universal visa allowing access to Zimbabwe.
Zimbabwe	eVisa / Visa on arrival	30 days	Also eligible for a universal visa allowing access to Zambia.

== Territories and disputed areas ==
Visa requirements for Dutch citizens for visits to various territories, disputed areas, partially recognized countries and restricted zones:

Europe

- Abkhazia — Visa required.
- Mount Athos — Special permit required (4 days: 25 euro for Orthodox visitors, 35 euro for non-Orthodox visitors, 18 euro for students). There is a visitors' quota: maximum 100 Orthodox and 10 non-Orthodox per day and women are not allowed.
- (Belarus) Brest and Grodno — Visa not required for 10 days. Visa-free pass needs to be obtained electronically.
- Northern Cyprus — Visa free access for 3 months.; ID card valid
- (United Nations) UN Buffer Zone in Cyprus — Access Permit is required for travelling inside the zone, except Civil Use Areas.
- Faroe Islands — Visa not required.; ID card valid
- Gibraltar — Visa not required.; ID card valid
- Guernsey – Visa not required.; ID card valid
- (Guernsey) Alderney – Visa not required.; ID card valid
- (Guernsey) Sark – Visa not required.; ID card valid
- Isle of Man — Visa not required.; ID card valid
- (Norway) Jan Mayen — permit issued by the local police required for staying for less than 24 hours and permit issued by the Norwegian police for staying for more than 24 hours.
- Jersey – Visa not required.; ID card valid
- Closed cities and regions in Russia — special authorization required.
- South Ossetia — Visa-free. Multiple entry visa to Russia and three-day prior notification are required to enter South Ossetia.
- Transnistria — Visa-free. Registration required after 24 hours.

Africa

- Eritrea (outside Asmara) — Visa covers Asmara only; to travel in the rest of the country, a Travel Permit for Foreigners is required (20 Eritrean nakfa).
- Sahrawi Arab Democratic Republic (Western Sahara controlled territory) — Visa not required up to 3 months.
- Somaliland — Visa issued on arrival (30 days for 30 US dollars, payable on arrival).
- Sudan — All foreigners traveling more than 25 kilometers outside of Khartoum must obtain a travel permit.
- (Sudan) Darfur — Separate travel permit is required.

Asia

- (China) Hainan — Visa on arrival for 15 days. Available at Haikou Meilan International Airport and Sanya Phoenix International Airport.
  Visa not required for 15 days for traveling as part of a tourist group (5 or more people)
- Hong Kong — Visa not required for 90 days.
- India — Protected Area Permit (PAP) required for whole states of Nagaland and Sikkim and parts of states Manipur, Arunachal Pradesh, Uttaranchal, Jammu and Kashmir, Rajasthan, Himachal Pradesh. Restricted Area Permit (RAP) required for all of Andaman and Nicobar Islands and parts of Sikkim. Some of these requirements are occasionally lifted for a year.
- Iraqi Kurdistan — e-Visa required; 30 days allowed stay.
- Kazakhstan — Special permission required for the town of Baikonur and surrounding areas in Kyzylorda Oblast, and the town of Gvardeyskiy near Almaty.
- (Iran) Kish Island — Visitors to Kish Island do not require a visa.
- (Lebanon) UNIFIL zone (except for the city of Tyre) — Security pass required, which can be obtained at the Army Security Service in Sidon.
- Macao — Visa not required for 90 days.
- (Malaysia) Sabah and Sarawak — These states have their own immigration authorities and passport is required to travel to them, however the same visa applies.
- Maldives — With the exception of the capital Malé, tourists are generally prohibited from visiting non-resort islands without the express permission of the Government of Maldives.
- North Korea outside Pyongyang – People are not allowed to leave the capital city, tourists can only leave the capital with a governmental tourist guide (no independent moving)
- Palestine — Visa not required. Arrival by sea to Gaza Strip not allowed.
- Taiwan — Visa not required for 90 days.
- (Tajikistan) Gorno-Badakhshan Autonomous Province — OIVR permit required (15+5 Tajikistani Somoni) and another special permit (free of charge) is required for Lake Sarez.
- Turkmenistan — A special permit, issued prior to arrival by Ministry of Foreign Affairs, is required if visiting the following places: Atamurat, Cheleken, Dashoguz, Serakhs and Serhetabat.
- (China) Tibet Autonomous Region — Tibet Travel Permit required (10 US Dollars).
- (United Nations) Korean Demilitarized Zone — restricted zone.
- (United Nations) UNDOF Zone and Ghajar — restricted zones.
- (Vietnam) Phú Quốc — can visit without a visa for up to 30 days.
- Yemen — Special permission needed for travel outside Sana'a or Aden.

Caribbean and North Atlantic

- Anguilla — Visa not required for 3 months.
- Aruba — Visa not required (nationals residing in Aruba)
  Visa not required for 180 days (others).
- (Netherlands) Bonaire, Sint Eustatius and Saba — Visa not required (Dutch nationals from Aruba, Bonaire, Curaçao, Saba, Sint Eustatius or Sint Maarten)
  Visa not required for 6 months (others).
- Bermuda — Visa not required for 21 days (extendable).
- British Virgin Islands — Visa not required for 1 month (extendable).
- Cayman Islands — Visa not required for 6 months.
- Colombia — Visitors arriving at San Andrés and Leticia must buy tourist cards on arrival.
- Curaçao — Visa not required (Dutch nationals from Aruba, Bonaire, Curaçao, Saba, Sint Eustatius or Sint Maarten)
  Visa not required for 6 months (others).
- Montserrat — Visa not required for 6 months.
- Greenland — Visa not required.
- (Venezuela) Margarita Island — All visitors are fingerprinted.
- Puerto Rico — Visa not required under the Visa Waiver Program, for 90 days on arrival from overseas for 2 years. ESTA required.
- Saint Pierre and Miquelon — Visa not required.
- Sint Maarten — Visa not required (Dutch nationals from Aruba, Bonaire, Curaçao, Saba, Sint Eustatius or Sint Maarten)
  Visa not required for 6 months (others).
- Turks and Caicos Islands — Visa not required for 90 days.
- U.S. Virgin Islands — Visa not required under the Visa Waiver Program, for 90 days on arrival from overseas for 2 years. ESTA required.

Oceania

- American Samoa — Electronic authorization for 30 days.
- (Australia) Ashmore and Cartier Islands — special authorisation required.
- (France) Clipperton Island — special permit required.
- Cook Islands — Visa free access for 31 days.
- (Fiji) Lau Province — Special permission required.
- French Polynesia — Visa not required.
- Guam — Visa not required under the Visa Waiver Program, for 90 days on arrival from overseas for 2 years. ESTA required.
- New Caledonia — Visa not required for 3 months.
- Niue — Visa on arrival valid for 30 days is issued free of charge.
- Northern Mariana Islands — Visa not required.
- Pitcairn Islands — 14 days visa free and landing fee US$35 or tax of US$5 if not going ashore.
- United States Minor Outlying Islands — special permits required for Baker Island, Howland Island, Jarvis Island, Johnston Atoll, Kingman Reef, Midway Atoll, Palmyra Atoll and Wake Island.
- Wallis and Futuna — Visa not required.

South America

- Galápagos — Online pre-registration is required. Transit Control Card must also be obtained at the airport prior to departure.

South Atlantic and Antarctica

- Falkland Islands — Visitor Permit valid for 4 weeks is issued on arrival.
- Saint Helena, Ascension and Tristan da Cunha
  - Ascension Island — eVisa for 3 months within any year period.
  - Saint Helena — Entry Permit (£25) for 183 days is issued on arrival.
  - Tristan da Cunha — Permission to land required for 15/30 pounds sterling (yacht/ship passenger) for Tristan da Cunha Island or 20 pounds sterling for Gough Island, Inaccessible Island or Nightingale Islands.
- South Georgia and the South Sandwich Islands — Pre-arrival permit from the Commissioner required (72 hours/1 month for 110/160 pounds sterling).
- Antarctica and adjacent islands — special permits required for French Southern and Antarctic Lands, Argentine Antarctica, (Australia) Australian Antarctic Territory, (Antártica Chilena Province) Chilean Antarctic Territory, (Australia) Heard Island and McDonald Islands, (Norway) Peter I Island, (Norway) Queen Maud Land, (New Zealand) Ross Dependency.
- Arab League — Certain countries will deny access to holders of Israeli visas or passport stamps of Israel because of the Arab League boycott of Israel.

== Non-ordinary passports ==
Holders of various categories of official Dutch passports have additional visa-free access to the following countries - Pakistan (diplomatic passports), Russia (diplomatic passports) and Turkey (diplomatic, official, service or special passports) . Holders of diplomatic or service passports of any country have visa-free access to Cape Verde, Ethiopia, Mali and Zimbabwe.

== Non-visa restrictions ==
=== Blank passport pages ===
Many countries require a minimum number of blank pages to be available in the passport being presented, typically one or two pages. Endorsement pages, which often appear after the visa pages, are not counted as being valid or available.

=== Vaccination ===
Cover of the new International Certificate of Vaccination issued by the Bureau of Quarantine in the Philippines since 2021

The African countries of Angola, Benin, Burkina Faso, Burundi, Cameroon, Central African Republic, Democratic Republic of the Congo, Republic of the Congo, Côte d'Ivoire, Gabon, Ghana, Guinea-Bissau, Mali, Niger, Sierra Leone and Togo, South Sudan and Uganda, along with French Guiana in South America, require all incoming passengers older than nine months to one year, to have a current International Certificate of Vaccination or Prophylaxis.

Some other countries require vaccination only if the passenger is coming from an infected area or has visited one recently or has transited for 12 hours in those countries: Algeria, Botswana, Cabo Verde, Chad, Djibouti, Egypt, Eswatini, Ethiopia, Gambia, Ghana, Guinea, Lesotho, Libya, Equatorial Guinea, Eritrea, Madagascar, Malawi, Mauritania, Mauritius, Mozambique, Namibia, Nigeria, Papua New Guinea, Seychelles, Somalia, South Africa, Sudan, Tunisia, Uganda, Tanzania, Zambia and Zimbabwe.

=== Passport validity length ===
Very few countries, such as Paraguay, just require a valid passport on arrival.

However many countries and groupings now require only an identity card – especially from their neighbours. Other countries may have special bilateral arrangements that depart from the generality of their passport validity length policies to shorten the period of passport validity required for each other's citizens or even accept passports that have already expired (but not been cancelled).

Some countries, such as Japan, Ireland and the United Kingdom, require a passport valid throughout the period of the intended stay.

In the absence of specific bilateral agreements, countries requiring passports to be valid for at least 6 more months on arrival include Afghanistan, Algeria, Anguilla, Bahrain, Bhutan, Botswana, British Virgin Islands, Brunei, Cambodia, Cameroon, Cape Verde, Cayman Islands, Central African Republic, Chad, Comoros, Costa Rica, Côte d'Ivoire, Curaçao, Ecuador, Egypt, El Salvador, Equatorial Guinea, Fiji, Gabon, Guinea Bissau, Guyana, Haiti, India, Indonesia, Iran, Iraq, Israel, Jordan, Kenya, Kiribati, Kuwait, Laos, Madagascar, Malaysia, Marshall Islands, Mongolia, Myanmar, Namibia, Nepal, Nicaragua, Nigeria, Oman, Palau, Papua New Guinea, Peru, Philippines, Qatar, Rwanda, Samoa, Saudi Arabia, Singapore, Solomon Islands, Somalia, Sri Lanka, Sudan, Suriname, Tanzania, Thailand, Timor-Leste, Tokelau, Tonga, Turkey, Tuvalu, Uganda, United Arab Emirates, Vanuatu, Venezuela, and Vietnam.

Countries requiring passports valid for at least 4 months on arrival include Micronesia and Zambia.

Countries requiring passports with a validity of at least 3 months beyond the date of intended departure include Azerbaijan, Bosnia and Herzegovina, Honduras, Montenegro, Nauru, Moldova and New Zealand. Similarly, the EEA countries of Iceland, Liechtenstein, Norway, all European Union countries (except Ireland) together with Switzerland also require 3 months validity beyond the date of the bearer's intended departure unless the bearer is an EEA or Swiss national.

Countries requiring passports valid for at least 3 months on arrival include Albania, North Macedonia, Panama, and Senegal.

Bermuda requires passports to be valid for at least 45 days upon entry.

Countries that require a passport validity of at least one month beyond the date of intended departure include Eritrea, Hong Kong, Lebanon, Macau, the Maldives and South Africa.

==== Maximum passport age ====
Countries of the Schengen area require non-EU passports to be less than 10 years old upon entry.

=== Criminal record ===
Some countries, including Australia, Canada, Fiji, New Zealand and the United States, routinely deny entry to non-citizens who have a criminal record, while others impose restrictions depending on the type of conviction and the length of the sentence.

=== Persona non grata ===
The government of a country can declare a diplomat persona non grata, banning them from entering the country or expelling them if they have already entered. In non-diplomatic use, the authorities of a country may also declare a foreigner persona non grata permanently or temporarily, usually because of unlawful activity.

=== Israeli stamps ===
Kuwait, Lebanon, Libya, and Yemen do not allow entry to people with passport stamps from Israel or whose passports have either a used or an unused Israeli visa, or where there is evidence of previous travel to Israel such as entry or exit stamps from neighbouring border posts in transit countries such as Jordan and Egypt.

To circumvent this Arab League boycott of Israel, the Israeli immigration services have now mostly ceased to stamp foreign nationals' passports on either entry to or exit from Israel (unless the entry is for some work-related purposes). Since 15 January 2013, Israel no longer stamps foreign passports at Ben Gurion Airport. Passports are still (as of 22 June 2017) stamped at Erez when passing into and out of Gaza.

Iran refuses admission to holders of passports containing an Israeli visa or stamp that is less than 12 months old.

=== Biometrics ===
Several countries mandate that all travellers, or all foreign travellers, be fingerprinted on arrival and will refuse admission to or even arrest travellers who refuse to comply. In some countries, such as the United States, this may apply even to transit passengers who merely wish to change planes rather than go landside.

Fingerprinting countries/regions include Afghanistan, Argentina, Brunei, Cambodia, China, Ethiopia, Ghana, Guinea, India, Japan, Kenya (both fingerprints and a photo are taken), Malaysia upon entry and departure, Mongolia, Saudi Arabia, the Schengen Area, Singapore, South Korea, Taiwan, Thailand, Uganda, the United Arab Emirates and the United States.

Many countries also require a photo be taken of people entering the country. The United States, which does not fully implement exit control formalities at its land frontiers (although long mandated by its own legislation), intends to implement facial recognition for passengers departing from international airports to identify people who overstay their visa.

Together with fingerprint and face recognition, iris scanning is one of three biometric identification technologies internationally standardised since 2006 by the International Civil Aviation Organization (ICAO) for use in e-passports and the United Arab Emirates conducts iris scanning on visitors who need to apply for a visa. The United States Department of Homeland Security has announced plans to greatly increase the biometric data it collects at US borders. In 2018, Singapore began trials of iris scanning at three land and maritime immigration checkpoints.

== Right to consular protection in non-EU countries ==
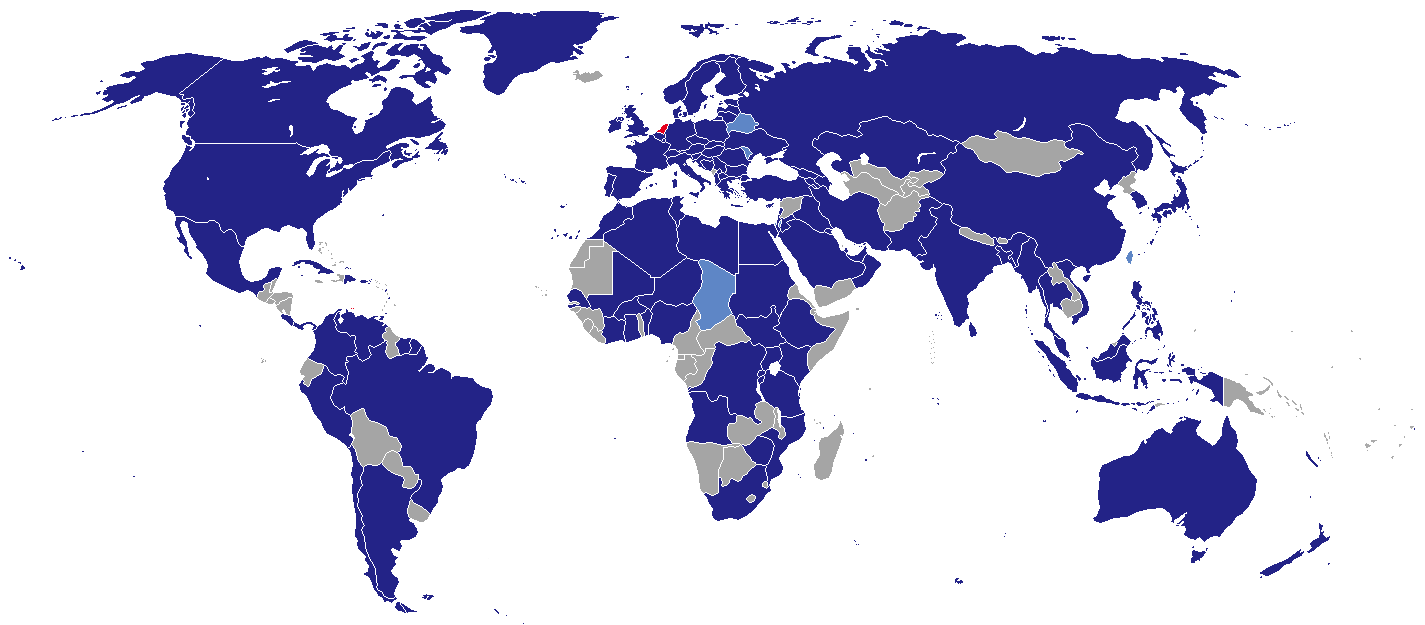
Countries with Dutch diplomatic missions

When in a non-EU country where there is no Dutch embassy, Dutch citizens as EU citizens have the right to get consular protection from the embassy of any other EU country present in that country.

See also List of diplomatic missions of Netherlands.

== See also ==
- Visa requirements for European Union citizens
- Dutch passport
- Visa policy of the Schengen Area
- Visa policy of the Kingdom of the Netherlands in the Caribbean
- Dutch nationality law
