= History of Dutch nationality =

The history of Dutch nationality is the emergence of a sense of national identity in the territory of the Netherlands. Consciousness of national identity was manifested through shared national obligations and rights such as taxation, military service, political and social rights, but most importantly through the concept of citizenship. Dutch nationality was forged through conflict which helped the people of the Low Countries develop a unifying idea of the Netherlander.

== Early stages ==
Before the formation of the Dutch Republic the land of the Low Countries had been inhabited by a number of disparate peoples who migrated from other lands and left only traces of their culture on the territory of the Low Countries. In the 10th century the Franks, Frisians and Saxons who lived in the territory of the Low Countries had no sense of common identity or unifying factors. The name "Dutch" that binds the people together as a single, unified group was not yet in use. Instead, the inhabitants of the lands were loyal to local lords, the territory that they lived on and to the towns of which they were burghers. In the early stages of existence, the concept of national identity had not been developed as a way by which a group of people could self-identify as such. Instead, they were labeled according to the place that they live and by their professions. Over time, these independent towns were subordinate to German, French, Roman or Spanish rule.

The turning point in the history of the Low Countries was the Flemish uprising in 1302 against the Francophiles, put into power by the French king. The Dutch burghers together defeated the French army at Kortrijk and, in so doing, developed a sense of their own strength and community.

In the fourteenth century, the Flemish vehemently denied their French citizenship and identified themselves as Fleming. This trend was noticeable throughout other counties and duchies in the Low Countries and formed the basis of the awakening of Dutch nationalism. Nationality, a sense of belonging to a specific group of people disregarding their geographical position, was beginning to evolve even before the formation of the Dutch Republic.

== Emergence of the Dutch culture ==
By the Middle Ages large parts of the population of the Low Countries lived in urbanized centers. These towns and large villages were the carriers of and the centers for self-recognition of Dutch culture. Art and poetry began to emerge, establishing a distinction between the Dutch and other peoples, in particular the French. These urban centers formed out of a realization that cooperation was necessary for survival. Individuals joined together to form communities, and in so doing gave up personal interests and subjugated themselves to local law. The formation of local law was a step towards unifying and defining the peoples' belonging to a specific state within the Low Countries, however it did not produce a feeling of a common nationality across the entire territory.

== Before the Dutch Republic ==
Under foreign rule, the Low Countries were able to extensively develop economically and politically. However, the sense of a shared "nationality" was still non-existent. This sense of nationality was forged through conflict and was the result of opposition to a despotic governing body. This opposition grew stronger with imposed taxation and centralization by the foreign ruler. The Dutch Revolt that occurred as a result of this opposition changed forever the structure of the Netherlands. Known as the Eighty Years War, the revolt lasted between 1568 and 1648 and allowed for the beginning of the formation of a sense of nationality and at about the middle of the 16th century, people no longer described themselves as inhabitants of one of the Provinces, but simply as Belga or Flamengus both signifying Netherlander. An awareness of a common nationality started to emerge as people began to identify themselves with a national group rather than with local interests.

=== Political rights ===
The States-General of the 17 states of the Netherlands convened annually to discuss matters of economics, religion and politics. Politically, the seventeen states grew closer to each other and by solving common problems began to develop a sense of opposition to the ruler. Through this resistance to outside rule, a sense of belonging to a common nation began to emerge. Centuries of being united by politics and economics allowed the people of the Low Countries – even though they spoke different languages – to feel part of a shared culture: the Netherlandish culture. Nevertheless, even though politically brought together the seventeen states did not develop a feeling of national identity. In the 16th and 17th centuries, these sentiments were not strong enough to mobilize the leading or the common class of the Low Countries. Nonetheless, opposition to centralization imposed by Charles V and Philip II helped to forge a national identity later on. While under foreign rule, neither citizenship nor a nationality law of the Low Countries existed on the national level.

=== Citizenship ===
Prior to the formation of the Dutch Republic, the seventeen provinces of the Netherlands had urban and not national citizenship. No inclusive citizenship status existed for the population of the Low Countries. Citizenship was a legal status available to all inhabitants of a particular city. There were certain obligation and privileges applied to all those that were burghers (citizens). These rights were never formally written down in legal documents, rather existed as a set of practices or city rights varying in every territory.

==== Obligations ====
- Live with a family in the area of citizenship.
- Pay taxes to the city that one was a burgher of.
- Social duties had to be fulfilled. An example would be the need to be part of militias guarding local streets.

Note: The last set of obligations applied to all inhabitants of the city and not only citizens. Closer to the end of the 17th century residents of cities shared obligations with citizens and enjoyed all, except political, citizenship rights.

==== Rights ====
- Right to freedom from serfdom.
- Right to trial under laws of town of citizenship.
- Right to access social privileges, such as orphanages, guilds, schools, etc.
- Right to not pay customs fee for merchandise sold at local markets. Only those that were citizens had the right to sell their goods at the market. This important privilege pushed many people to acquire citizenship.
- Right to hold public office. Political participation was the right only of citizens and only of those that held the status for more than five years.

==== Ways to acquire citizenship ====
- By descent (Jewish children could not acquire citizenship in this way and were obliged to buy it.)
- By purchase
- By Marriage (This applied only to women. Women lost their original citizenship upon marriage and gained that of their husband.)
- By Gift (Usually granted to merchants, clerics, and skilled craftsmen.)

=== Taxation ===
The taxation methods imposed on the Low Countries under the Habsburgs were mainly targeted at providing money for military operations. Under Charles V, taxes in the Netherlands were raised fivefold in order to accommodate his conflict with the French. The money that the populations of the Low Countries paid did not go toward forging a national state which could unite them under one nationality. On the contrary the Low Countries were an integrated, prosperous, densely populated, and developing part of the Habsburg empire.

=== Religion ===
Religion was neither a unifying factor of Dutch nationality, nor the seed of the separation of the Low Countries into two separate entities. While both Protestants and Catholics came together in their opposition to Spanish rule, it was only with the common goal of fighting for Netherlands liberties and freedoms, and not for the recognition of the Dutch nationality.

== Dutch Republic ==
In 1579, the Treaty of Utrecht was signed unifying the northern provinces of the Netherlands. An outcome of the Dutch Revolt, the republic was not yet internationally recognized, but soon gained that status with the Peace of Westphalia in 1648. The idea of patriotism was widespread but was not a strong force. Similarly, the concept of the ‘fatherland’ was also general but created both unity and disunity within the population inasmuch as it was a debated concept. In the 1780s the national consciousness present for centuries was converted to modern nationalism.

=== Social rights ===
Even though urban governments showed rare signs of democracy they were primarily an oligarchic system marked by an exclusive hierarchy. Class divisions, however were not as deep as in other European states, and the rights that the common class possessed did not differ much from what the intellectuals could practice. There was a cultural harmony and it prevented the formation of two completely divided classes and allowed for a social participation of all. Similarly, the basis of education was the same for all, and this allowed for a social bond. The difference in rights that the upper and lower classes possessed was reduced to the amount of money available to the individual. If one was wealthy, he could afford higher-level education. However, this alone did not earn him any political privileges or extensive political rights but only the ability to earn more wealth. The whole population of the Dutch Republic did not have the choice of voting for the representative of the Country inasmuch as there was not a choice between a democracy and an aristocracy but rather between an aristocracy and a monarchy. The stadtholder would be a member of the House of Orange-Nassau.

=== Citizenship rights ===
In the 18th century, in the Dutch Republic, there was no national civil law which united the whole population. Each town had its own civil law stipulating citizen rights and obligations, based on the citizenship model of the Roman Republic. Citizenship law of the burghers was still restricted to only the town's population, and completely excluded the people of the countryside.

The rights of citizenship were based on the principle of jus soli, signifying that rights would be granted to all those born on the territory. However, this was not applied uniformly and in some cities as for example in Nijmegen, citizenship could be acquired only by jus sanguinis. Furthermore, as was the case prior to the establishment of the Dutch Republic, citizenship could be purchased if one had lived in the particular city for a period of time. The price for citizenship likewise varied from place to place. This unique way of naturalization of the 18th century was accompanied by rights, obligations and an oath of allegiance to the community of burghers that one was becoming part of.

In addition, all those that were citizens of the republic had a collection of political and civic rights. The extent to which these rights could be exercised in the Dutch Republic in the 18th century by far surpassed that of other European countries.

==== Political ====
Citizens enjoyed legal protection of life and property from their governing body. A legal system encompassing the whole population of the republic did not yet exist. As in the 17th century the extent of this protection of life and property, varied from city to city. Meaning that if one burgher was to travel from his hometown to another territory, he was not protected by the law of the territory that he was on, but by the law of the territory that he was a burgher of. If there was infringement on his rights, the court would treat him in accordance with the rights relevant to him.

==== Civic ====
- All those that were burghers of their city had the right to participate in political debate.
- Right to representation
- Right to freedom of assembly and association. There were no restrictions to setting up clubs and societies.
- Right of freedom of expression

=== Military service ===
In the 18th century, military service was considered a privilege of only the burghers. However, as the century came to a close the essence of military service changed inasmuch as city authorities imposed the service on all townspeople regardless of whether they were burghers or not. This is similar to changes that took place in the sphere of citizenship rights.

=== Dutch women ===
==== Social rights ====
Women of the Netherlands were not a marginalized part of society but on the contrary participated actively in social life. However, that applied only to those women who possessed a good reputation and a respected name. Both arbitrary categories, good reputation stemmed from the economic prosperities available, and the respected name was determined by the women's goodwill and decency of husband. Women of high birth were accepted as citizens. Moreover, women from the established middle classes were also accepted as citizens but their rights, only consisted of taking care of domestic affairs. Whereas, women of high birth enjoyed slightly more privileges, such as the ability to participate in trades and even several guilds. Furthermore, certain trades and guilds such as turftonsters (women who collected taxes on peat sales) and uitdraagsters (women who sold second-hand merchandise) were restricted only to women. The participation level was strongly dependent on the criterion of respectability of a woman.

Overall, women had a lot less opportunities than men, but their status was never clearly defined. Those that possessed money and a good reputation were never restricted from participating in social life and by the end of the 18th century their participation in cultural life augmented dramatically. As well, in their societies women were able to manage financial affairs, travel unaccompanied to social gatherings such as the theatre, run stores, form societies (best known of which is the Ladies Natural Science Association in Middelburg founded in 1785), and carry out heavy manual labour (women of the lower classes). Such involvement in society, however, was sometimes met with resistance, even though by participating in the social sphere women were not breaking any laws.

== The Dutch in the 19th century ==
The year 1795 marked the downfall of the Dutch Republic and gave birth to the Batavian Republic. At the beginning of the 19th century, the first codification of Dutch national citizenship appeared in the Napoleonic Code for the Kingdom of Holland effective from 1801 to 1811, originating from the French code of civil rights, the Code Civil. In 1813, after the proclamation of the Kingdom of the Netherlands, the Code Civil continued to remain in effect even though a new Dutch constitution was drawn in 1815. The new constitution de facto became the first Dutch codification of Dutch citizenship, where it was stated that, starting from 1815, only residents had the freedom to occupy positions in public offices. This was a significant change from the citizenship laws of the preceding centuries. The Dutch civil code stipulated that residents were only those people who were born to parents officially residing on Dutch territory. Due to the colonial ambitions of the Netherlands, all those people who traveled abroad in official service of the country were considered to live in the Netherlands and were to be counted as residents. The new Dutch civil law was the building block for the implementation of jus sanguinis. On the other hand, even though descent remained very important for the acquisition of citizenship, the emphasis on the significance of residency, was evidence of the French influence of jus soli.

In 1838, a new Dutch civil code (Burgerlijk Wetboek) replaced the Code Civil and dealt with nationality in a new, Dutch way but still largely influence by the French system. The new Burgerlijk Wetboek cemented the rights of nationality of women and touched upon the loss of nationality. Dutch nationality would be lost by naturalization or permanent residence in another country. As well, serving in a foreign army and providing labour for a foreign public service without royal permission would deprive one of Dutch nationality.

=== Women in the 1838 Dutch Civil Code ===
The nationality of married women was determined in the same way as in the Code Civil. This meant that a woman's nationality was dependent on the nationality of her husband. A Dutch woman marrying a non-Dutch man would automatically lose her nationality, and conversely a non-Dutch woman marrying a Dutch man necessarily acquired Dutch nationality. In addition, a woman would lose her nationality status as soon as she permanently resided or naturalized in another country

=== 1848 Constitution and 1850 Nationality Law ===
The next important step in the history of Dutch nationality was the 1848 constitution which stated that (1) a person had to be Dutch to possess the right of nationality and (2) all those with Dutch citizenship have the ability to be employed in public services. In this way, nationality law became part of public law. However, the definition of nationality remained in the code of civil law. This created a problem because not all those defined Dutch by the 1838 civil code were necessarily privileged to enjoy public rights. Because of this, a new nationality law was implemented in 1850 in order to limit the inclusiveness of the nationality law based on the French system. Nevertheless, the new 1850 nationality law did not replace the 1838 civil code and this in turn led to the creation of a double nationality; political nationality as stated in 1850, and civil nationality of the 1838 civil code. The uncertainties were eliminated in 1892 with the implementation of the Nationality Act which replaced both 1838 and 1850 nationality acts. The new law was based on the German system of jus sanguinis and excluded all previous mention of the principle of jus soli. The new Dutch nationality law survived until the amendments of 1985.

== Dutch colonies ==
Having been a naval power, the Netherlands possessed colonies in the western hemisphere as well as in the Dutch East Indies (Indonesia), Formosa, and Cape Colony in the southern hemisphere. Since the beginning of Dutch colonialism, the metropolis expressed more interest in the economic rather than the nationality aspect of their colonies. There was no policy of assimilation in the Dutch colonies, as in some French colonies. Even though, colonies were used for profit, politics and laws were controlled by Dutchmen with the help of local elites. In this way, in the southern hemisphere the Dutch may be considered as newcomers imposing their rules, whereas in the Caribbean the Dutch created their own subject and made a local society.

=== Eastern Hemisphere ===
The populations of Dutch colonies were all considered subjects of the empire and given limited political and social rights. The Dutch East Indies in particular, were always of greater interest than the Caribbean. The formation of the Dutch East India Company in 1602 always brought great capital to the metropolis and contributed significantly to the Dutch economy. There was no desire to create integrated Dutch and East Indies societies before the 20th century. In the 20th century, however, the Dutch colonial policy towards the East Indies changed and moved from the liberalist to neoliberalist point of view of how to deal with imperial possessions. The trend showed the desire to guard the rights of the natives and implement a better protection of colonies against outside threat. With this idea, the Netherlands began a program of greater integration in the Dutch East Indies. It was based primarily on the humanitarian idea of offering help and guidance to achieve peace and order. This was due to the assumption that subjects of the empire were not mature enough to build their own state or politics, and the mother country felt the obligation to educate them in the sphere and set an example. The new policy was called Assimilation and aimed to create a unity between Eastern and Western Dutchmen. The new harmony would be joined politically and nationally disregarding racial differences which could not weaken it. This however would mean the granting of political autonomy to the dependent Indonesia, something that a large number of Dutchmen did not agree with primarily because of economic reasons. This cultural and national synthesis was never realized in as much as strong nationalistic feelings in the Dutch East Indies, and European affairs soon ripped the plan apart.

Eastern Hemisphere Dutch colonies:

- Dutch East Indies
- Dutch Ceylon
- Formosa (modern day Taiwan)
- Malacca
- Deshima
- New Holland
- Cape Colony

=== Western Hemisphere ===
Colonies of the Caribbean were never intended to be carriers of Dutch culture and language. The slave populations of the Caribbean colonies had almost no contact with the Dutch culture and as a result of this, a mixed Caribbean culture was created based largely on African roots. The populations were governed by Dutchmen who were not elected by the locals but rather sent from the metropolis.

The separation between the Dutch and their subjects was great. For example, in Suriname, one of the most important Dutch colonies in South America, the Dutch language was foreign to ninety-five percent of the population, and only the local elites learned the language and attended Dutch schools. Dutch was never successfully imposed on the majority. In fact, often the populations of the Dutch Caribbean spoke languages of adjacent colonial powers such as Spanish, Portuguese and English and not the language of their colonizer. Overall, colonies in the Caribbean were used solely as plantation centers to extract profit. However, the economic benefits received from these territories was less than that of Indonesia. Consequently, the Netherlands did not display deep interest in Caribbean societies. This is why Essequibo, Demerar, and Berbice were given up to the British in the middle of the 19th century.

==== Suriname and the Antilles ====
For the Dutch, relations with Suriname and Antilles were always closer than with the rest of their subjects. In the 20th century, the Dutch nationality policy towards Suriname stated that locals could choose to become Dutch citizens in the 1970s and 80s, and migration doors were open. The policy was viable only during that period and since then Surinamese migration is only possible through the family-reunion/formation program. The Antilles however, are part of the Netherlands to this day and the people are considered Dutch citizens with all the rights, privileges and obligations that that entails.

Western hemisphere Dutch colonies:

- Aruba
- Curaçao
- Dutch Antilles
- Dutch Brazil
- Essequibo, Demerara, Berbice (modern day Guyana)
- New Netherlands
- Suriname

== See also ==
- Dutch people
- Constitution of the Netherlands
- Culture of the Netherlands
- Politics of the Netherlands
