= ID-kaart =

ID-kaart may refer to:

- Belgian identity card
- Dutch identity card
- Estonian identity card
