= Civil procedure in Australia =

The rules of civil procedure in Australia govern procedure in the various courts and tribunals in Australia. Civil procedure in Australia was historically derived from, and continues to resemble, civil procedure in England and Wales. The rules vary between the different courts and tribunals.

== History ==
Before Federation, each Australian colony had a two- or three-tiered judicial system with a Supreme Court at its apex. The colonial Supreme Courts followed the model of the Supreme Court of Judicature of England and Wales, as the High Court of Justice was known from the 1870s, when it was established by the Judicature Acts. Civil procedure in the colonial Supreme Courts was governed by rules made by the judges and known as the Rules of the Supreme Court, some of which continue in force today.

== Legislation ==
Most states have now codified the rules of civil procedure as delegated legislation, sometimes known as Uniform Civil Procedure Rules. The Chief Justice of the relevant Supreme Court is generally the chair of a rules committee with the power to amend the rules. However, the title and structure of the relevant civil procedure rules is not uniform across jurisdictions.

For example, the Uniform Civil Procedure Rules 2005 (NSW) and Uniform Civil Procedure Rules 1999 (Qld) are quite different. In Queensland, the rules were intended to be "uniform, so far as practicable, for all three courts in the State stream" – that is, to unify the procedure of the Supreme, District and Magistrates Court, not participate in a cooperative federalism effort like the Uniform Evidence Acts.

The following legislation governs civil procedure in each jurisdiction.

=== Commonwealth ===
- High Court of Australia Act 1979 (Cth)
  - High Court Rules 2004 (Cth)
- Federal Court of Australia Act 1976 (Cth)
  - Federal Court Rules 2011 (Cth)
- Federal Circuit and Family Court of Australia Act 2021 (Cth)
  - Federal Circuit and Family Court of Australia (Family Law) Rules 2021 (Cth)
  - Federal Circuit and Family Court of Australia (Division 2) (Family Law) Rules 2021 (Cth)
  - Federal Circuit and Family Court of Australia (Division 2) (Bankruptcy) Rules 2021 (Cth)
  - Federal Circuit and Family Court of Australia (Division 2) (General Federal Law) Rules 2021 (Cth)

=== New South Wales ===
- Civil Procedure Act 2005 (NSW)
  - Uniform Civil Procedure Rules 2005 (NSW)
- Supreme Court Act 1970 (NSW)
  - Supreme Court Rules 1970 (NSW)
- District Court Act 1973 (NSW)
  - District Court Rules 2009 (NSW)
- Local Court Act 2007 (NSW)
  - Local Court Rules 2009 (NSW)

=== Queensland ===
- Civil Proceedings Act 2011 (Qld)
- Supreme Court of Queensland Act 1991 (Qld)
  - Uniform Civil Procedure Rules 1999 (Qld)
- District Court of Queensland Act 1967 (Qld)
- Magistrates Court Act 1921 (Qld)

=== South Australia ===
- Supreme Court Act 1935 (SA)
- Uniform Civil Rules 2020 (SA)
- District Court Act 1991 (SA)
- Magistrates Court Act 1991 (SA)

=== Tasmania ===
- Supreme Court Rules 2000 (Tas)
- Magistrates Court (Civil Division) Rules 1998 (Tas)

=== Victoria ===
- Civil Procedure Act 2010 (Vic)
- Supreme Court (General Civil Procedure) Rules 2015 (Vic)
- County Court Civil Procedure Rules 2008 (Vic)
- Magistrates' Court General Civil Procedure Rules 2010 (Vic)

=== Western Australia ===
- Rules of the Supreme Court 1971 (WA)
- District Court Rules 2005 (WA)
- Magistrates Court (Civil Proceedings) Act 2004 (WA)
- Magistrates Court (Civil Proceedings) Rules 2005 (WA)
- Magistrates Court (Minor Cases Procedure) Rules 2005 (WA)

=== Australian Capital Territory ===
- Court Procedures Rules 2006 (ACT)

=== Northern Territory ===
- Supreme Court Rules (NT)
- Local Court (Civil Jurisdiction) Rules (ACT)

== Commentary ==
Civil procedure is one of the Priestley 11 subjects which all Australian lawyers are required to study. There are a number of textbooks available, as well as regularly-updated commentaries for legal professionals.

- NSW Civil Procedure Handbook 2021. Thomson Reuters.
- Ritchie's Uniform Civil Procedure New South Wales. LexisNexis.
- Principles of Civil Procedure in Victoria (2nd ed.). Thomson Reuters. 2018.
- Civil Procedure Victoria. LexisNexis.
- Civil Procedure Western Australia. LexisNexis.
- John McKenna QC. "Uniform Civil Procedure Rules Digest". Supreme Court of Queensland.

== See also ==
- Civil procedure
- Judiciary of Australia
- Primary and secondary legislation
- Lawsuit
- Summons
- Subpoena
- Interlocutory injunction
- Summary judgment
- Judgment (law)
