= Civil procedure code of the Netherlands =

The Dutch Code of Civil Procedure (Dutch: Wetboek van Burgerlijke Rechtsvordering) comprises four books covering topics relating to court civil procedure.

The four books cover:

- The procedures of the district courts (Rechtbank), the superior courts (Gerechthof), and the Dutch High Court (Hoge Raad der Nederlanden)
- Enforcement of judgments, orders, and legislation
- Case law
- Arbitration

== See also ==
- Dutch Civil Code
