= Civil Justice Fairness Act =

Proposed law in the United States

The Civil Justice Fairness Act (S. 672, S. 79) was proposed to limit the amount of monetary compensation awardable in civil case to a maximum of either $250,000 or 300% of the economic damage caused by the defendant; whichever was greater. Opponents of this act argued that federal restrictions of this sort would illegally preempt state authority.

The bill was a combination of two preceding bills. First, the Product Liability Fairness Act of 1995 (H.R. 956), was passed by the US Congress, but was vetoed by President Clinton. Second, the Attorney Accountability Act of 1995 (H.R. 988) passed the house.

== See also ==
- Tort reform
- Civil procedure
- Lawsuit
