= Civil procedure =

Rules and standards used in civil lawsuits

Civil procedure is the body of law that sets out the rules and regulations along with some standards that courts follow when adjudicating civil lawsuits (as opposed to procedures in criminal law matters). These rules govern how a lawsuit or case may be commenced; what kind of service of process (if any) is required; the types of pleadings or statements of case, motions or applications, and orders allowed in civil cases; the timing and manner of depositions and discovery or disclosure; the conduct of trials; the process for judgment; the process for post-trial procedures; various available remedies; and how the courts and clerks must function.

== Differences from criminal procedure ==
In most cases, criminal prosecutions are pursued by the state in order to punish offenders, although some systems, such as in English and French law, allow citizens to bring a private prosecution. Conversely, civil actions are initiated by private individuals, companies or organizations, for their own benefit. Government agencies may also be a party to civil actions. Civil and criminal cases are usually heard in different courts.

In jurisdictions based on English common law, the party bringing a criminal charge is the prosecution, while the party bringing a civil action is usually called the plaintiff or claimant. In both types of cases, the opposing party is the defendant.

In criminal proceedings, the government appears first in the case title. In the United States, the styling varies by jurisdiction: in federal prosecutions the case is styled United States v. Sanchez; some states use People v. Sanchez (for example, California and New York); others use State v. Sanchez or State of [State Name] v. Sanchez; and the four states that formally style themselves as Commonwealths (Massachusetts, Pennsylvania, Virginia, and Kentucky) use Commonwealth v. Sanchez. In England and Wales, a criminal case would be styled R. v. Sanchez, with "R." standing for Rex or Regina and pronounced "The Crown". Similar forms are used in other Commonwealth jurisdictions.

In civil proceedings, the party who initiates the action is listed first. Thus, a lawsuit between Ms. Sanchez and Mr. Smith would appear as Sanchez v. Smith if Sanchez filed the claim, or Smith v. Sanchez if Smith did. The order of the parties may change if the case is appealed.

Most countries make a clear distinction between civil and criminal procedure. For example, a criminal court may force a convicted defendant to pay a fine as punishment for their crime, and the legal costs of both the prosecution and defence. But the victim of the crime generally pursues their claim for compensation in a civil, not a criminal, action. In France and England, however, a victim of a crime may incidentally be awarded compensation by a criminal court judge.

Evidence from a criminal trial is generally admissible as evidence in a civil action about the same matter. For example, the victim of a road accident does not directly benefit if the driver who injured them is found guilty of the crime of careless driving. The victim still has to prove his case in a civil action, unless the doctrine of collateral estoppel applies, as it does in most American jurisdictions. The victim may be able to prove their civil case even when the driver is found not guilty in the criminal trial, because the standard to determine guilt is higher than the standard to determine fault. However, if a driver is found by a civil jury not to have been negligent, a prosecutor may be estopped from charging them criminally.

If the plaintiff has shown that the defendant is liable, the main remedy in a civil court is the amount of money, or "damages", which the defendant should pay to the plaintiff. Alternative civil remedies include restitution or transfer of property, or an injunction to restrain or order certain actions.

The standards of proof are higher in a criminal case than in a civil one, since the state does not wish to risk punishing an innocent person. In English law the prosecution must prove the guilt of a criminal "beyond reasonable doubt"; but the plaintiff in a civil action is required to prove his case "on the balance of probabilities". Thus, in a criminal case a crime cannot be proven if the person or persons judging it doubt the guilt of the suspect and have a reason (not just a feeling or intuition) for this doubt. But in a civil case, the court will weigh all the evidence and decide what is most probable.

== Types ==
Civil procedure is traditionally divided into inquisitorial and adversarial.

== By country ==
- Australia
- Brazil
- Canada
- England and Wales
- Germany
- India
- Italy
- Netherlands
- Romania
- Scotland
- South Africa
- United States
- Bhutan

== See also ==
- Affirmative defense
- Case citation
- Civil Justice Fairness Act
- Criminal procedure
- Jurisdiction
- Laches
- Objection
- Prejudice (law)
- Statute of limitations
- Summary judgment
- Time constraints
- Trial de novo
