= Visa policy of the Kingdom of the Netherlands in the Caribbean =

Policy on permits required to enter the Kingdom of the Netherlands in the Caribbean

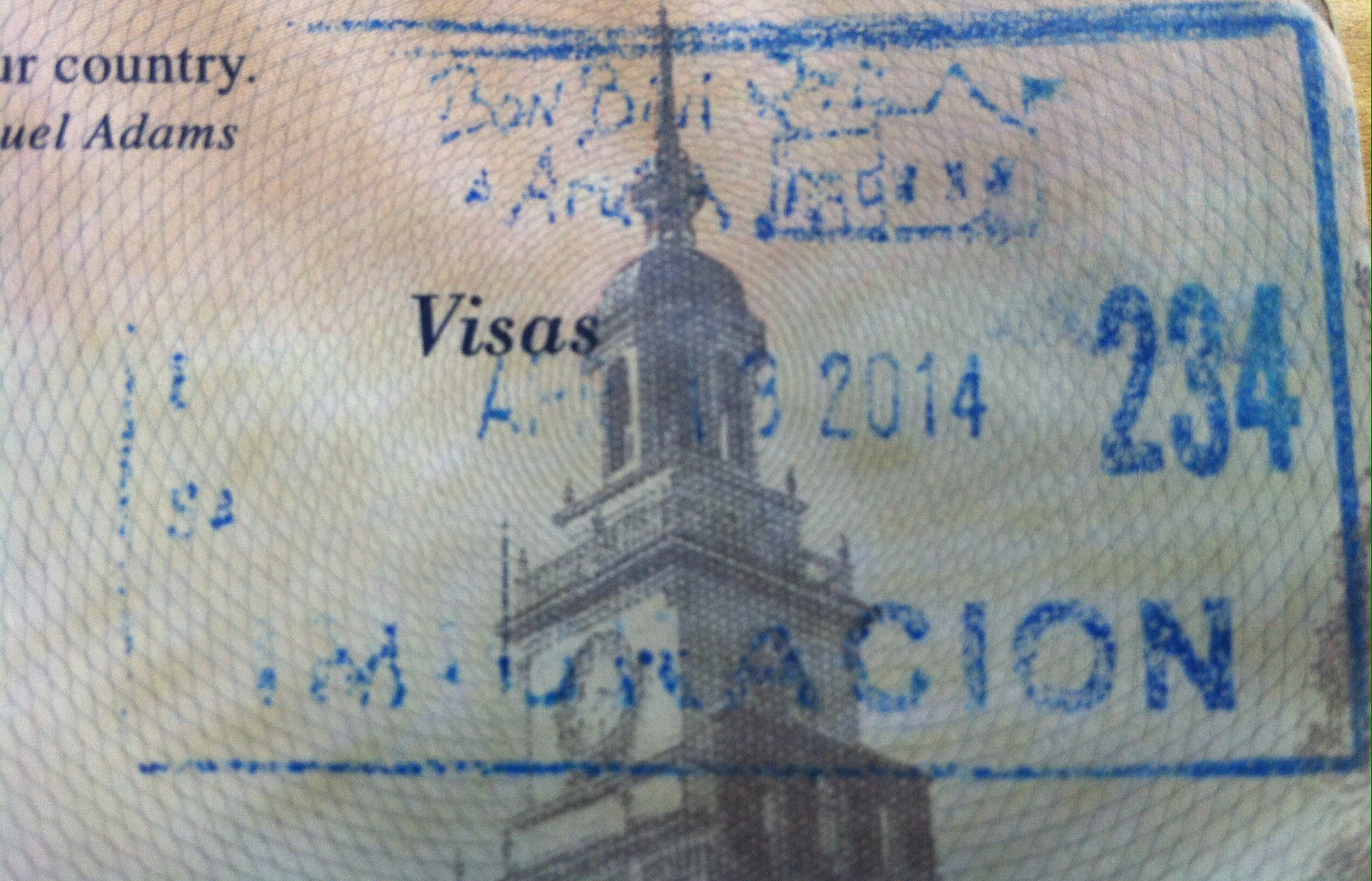
Aruba passport stamp (background: Independence Hall, Philadelphia, US)

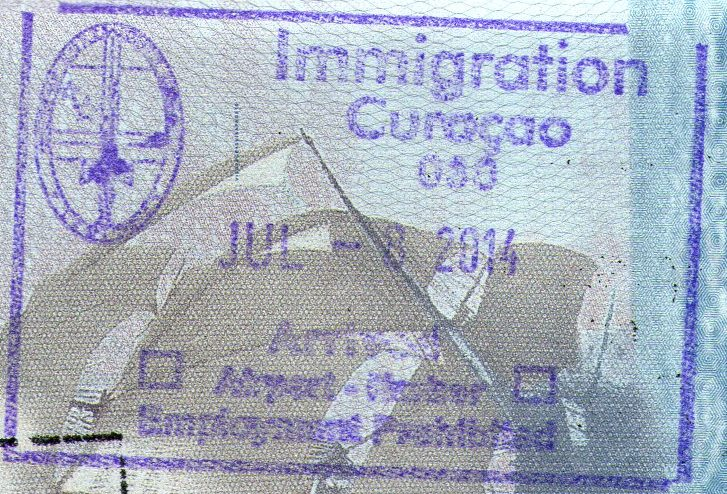
Curaçao entry stamp

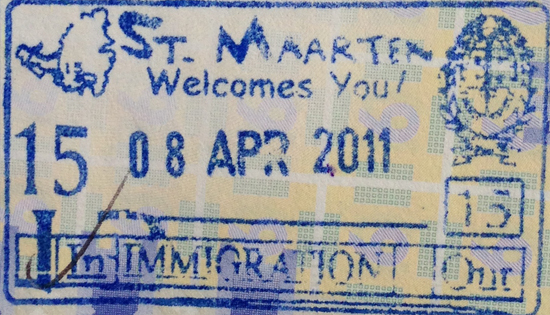
Sint Maarten entry stamp

A common visa exists since the end of 2010 for the territories of Aruba, Curaçao, Sint Maarten (landen (English: countries) within the Kingdom) and the Caribbean Netherlands (Bonaire, Sint Eustatius and Saba, which are part of the country the Netherlands) which form together the territory of the Kingdom of the Netherlands in the Caribbean. The visa is not valid for the European part of the Netherlands, which is part of the Schengen Area.

== Visa ==
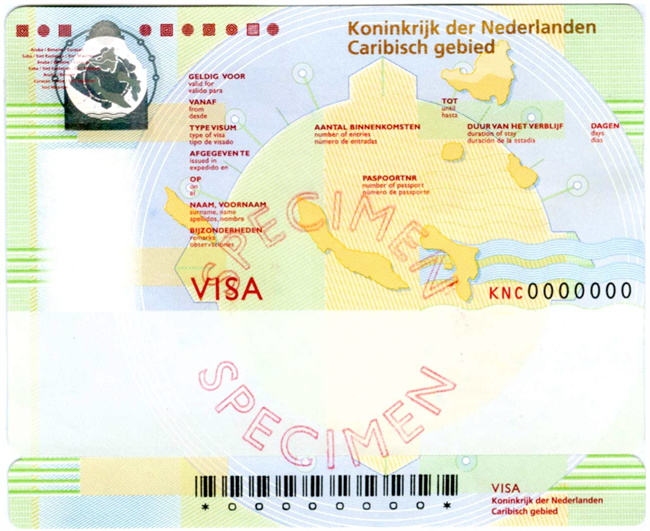
Common visa for the territories

A standard visa is valid for all 6 islands and allows multiple entry for a maximum period of 90 days within 180 days. The maximum uninterrupted stay in one of the individual countries is 30 days. The visa is not valid for the European part of the Netherlands. Application takes place at the consular representations of the Kingdom and the main visiting country has to be indicated. The basis for evaluation of the evaluation of the application in the main visiting country is however the same for the whole area. Entry for longer periods is arranged by the different countries separately.

== History ==
The two Caribbean countries within the Kingdom of the Netherlands were Aruba and the Netherlands Antilles. They each had their own visa policy and thus a list of countries from which nationals could enter without a visa. Through consultation between all countries in the Kingdom the requirements showed strong similarities; they were based on the visa free lists for the Schengen Area, extended with countries in the Caribbean. Upon the Dissolution of the Netherlands Antilles on 10 October 2010, the common visa system was introduced for all territories of the Kingdom in the Caribbean: Aruba, Curaçao, Sint Maarten as well as Bonaire, Sint Eustatius and Saba. The maximum period of stay is 3 months for all countries on the visa-free list for which full reciprocity is in place; for other countries the maximum period is 30 days.

== Visa policy map ==
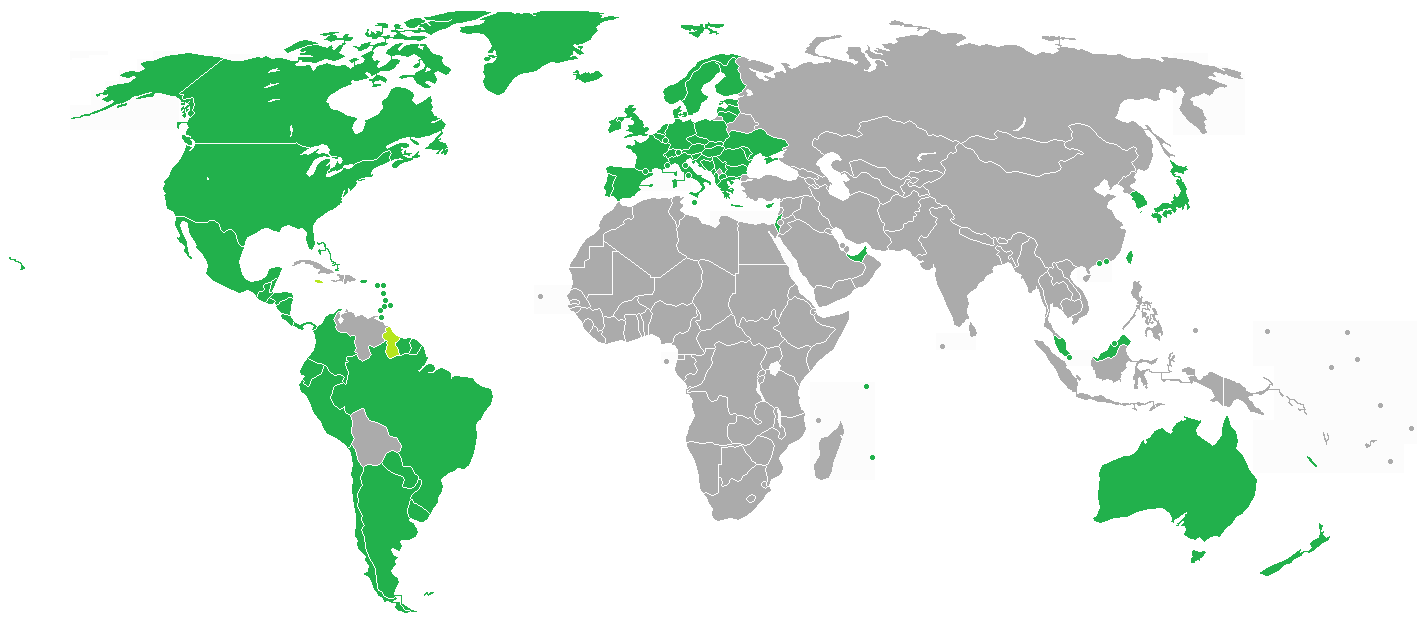
Countries whose nationals can enter Aruba, Curaçao, Sint Maarten and the Caribbean Netherlands without a visa

== Visa exemption ==
Nationals of the following countries and territories do not need a visa for a stay for up to 90 days in Aruba, Curaçao, Sint Maarten and the Caribbean Netherlands.

- All European Union member states
- Albania
- Andorra
- Antigua and Barbuda
- Argentina
- Australia
- Bahamas
- Barbados
- Belize
- Bosnia and Herzegovina
- Brazil
- Brunei
- Canada
- Chile
- Colombia
- Costa Rica
- Dominica
- Ecuador
- El Salvador
- Grenada
- Guatemala
- Guyana (Note: Visa required for Sint Maarten.)
- Honduras
- Hong Kong (Note: Holders of a Hong Kong Special Administrative Region passport.)
- Iceland
- Israel
- Jamaica (Note: Visa-free only for Curaçao.)
- Japan
- Liechtenstein
- Macao (Note: Holders of a Macao Special Administrative Region passport.)
- Malaysia
- Mauritius
- Mexico
- Moldova
- Monaco
- Montenegro
- New Zealand
- Nicaragua
- North Macedonia
- Norway
- Panama
- Paraguay
- Peru
- Saint Kitts and Nevis
- Saint Lucia
- Saint Vincent and the Grenadines
- San Marino
- Serbia
- Seychelles
- Singapore
- South Korea
- Suriname
- Switzerland
- Taiwan (Note: Holders of a Taiwan passport containing a national identification number.)
- Trinidad and Tobago
- Ukraine (Note: Holders of a biometric passport.)
- United Arab Emirates
- United Kingdom (Note: Including all classes of British nationality.)
- United States
- Uruguay
- Vatican City

Furthermore, the following groups are exempted from the visa requirement:

- Travelers transiting an airport in Aruba between 7:00 and 23:00, in Sint Maarten on the same day, and in the other territories for up to 48 hours (except nationals of Haiti transiting an airport in Curaçao);
- Travelers transiting by land from Sint Maarten to Saint Martin, holding a visa for Saint Martin (if required) and a hotel reservation;
- Cruise ship passengers for up to 24 hours in Aruba and 48 hours in the other territories;
- The crew of a ship or aircraft for up to 48 hours;
- Holders of a United Nations laissez-passer;
- Diplomats accredited to the whole Kingdom of the Netherlands;
- Holders of diplomatic, service/official and special passports of Tunisia and Turkey, holders of diplomatic and service/official passports of Bolivia, Georgia, Indonesia, Jamaica, Malawi, Morocco and Thailand, and holders of diplomatic passports of Chad, Kazakhstan, Pakistan and Senegal;
- Holders of a refugee or stateless person travel document issued by the Kingdom of the Netherlands, or, in accordance with the 1951 Convention relating to the Status of Refugees, a refugee travel document or certificate of identity issued by Canada, or a refugee travel document (Form I-571), re-entry permit or advance parole issued by the United States.

=== Dutch nationals ===
Although all Dutch nationals have the right of abode in the European Netherlands, the right of abode in the Dutch Caribbean is limited to those who have a connection to the region. Other Dutch nationals can enter the region visa-free for a maximum of 6 months. The identity card BES and the cedula of Aruba, Curaçao and Sint Maarten are valid for entering Bonaire, Sint Eustatius or Saba, but the Dutch identity card is not.

=== Substitute visas ===
Nationals of any country who are not otherwise visa exempted can enter Aruba, Curaçao, Sint Maarten and the Caribbean Netherlands for a maximum of 90 days provided holding a valid visa, residence or return permit for any part of the Kingdom of the Netherlands, a Schengen country, Ireland or the United Kingdom, or a residence or return permit for Canada, the United States, the French overseas departments (French Guiana, Guadeloupe, Martinique, Mayotte and Réunion) or the French overseas collectivities of Saint Barthélemy and Saint Martin.

Holders of a visa for Saint Martin do not need a visa for Sint Maarten, but need a visa for the other territories (if not otherwise exempt).

In addition, nationals of the following countries can enter provided they hold a valid visa for Canada or the United States.

- Bolivia
- China
- Cuba
- Dominican Republic
- Guyana (Note: For Sint Maarten only. Already exempt for the other territories.)
- Haiti
- India
- Jamaica (Note: For Aruba, Sint Maarten and the Caribbean Netherlands only. Already exempt for Curaçao.)
- Venezuela

=== Summary of visa exemptions ===
Country	Netherlands (Schengen)	Aruba and Caribbean Netherlands	Curaçao	Sint Maarten
EU single market	Yes	Yes	Yes	Yes
Schengen 'Annex II' (Note: Except East Timor, Georgia, Kosovo, Venezuela, and Oceanian countries added since 2015 (Kiribati, Marshall Islands, Micronesia, Palau, Samoa, Solomon Islands, Tonga, and Tuvalu).)	Yes	Yes	Yes	Yes
East Timor	Yes	No	No	No
Georgia	Yes	No	No	No
Kiribati	Yes	No	No	No
Kosovo	Yes	No	No	No
Marshall Islands	Yes	No	No	No
Micronesia	Yes	No	No	No
Palau	Yes	No	No	No
Samoa	Yes	No	No	No
Solomon Islands	Yes	No	No	No
Tonga	Yes	No	No	No
Tuvalu	Yes	No	No	No
Venezuela	Yes	No	No	No
Belize	No	Yes	Yes	Yes
Ecuador	No	Yes	Yes	Yes
Suriname	No	Yes	Yes	Yes
Guyana	No	Yes	Yes	No
Jamaica	No	No	Yes	No

== See also ==
- Visa policy of the Schengen Area
- Dutch nationality law
