= Identity card BES =

Identity card of The Caribbean Netherlands

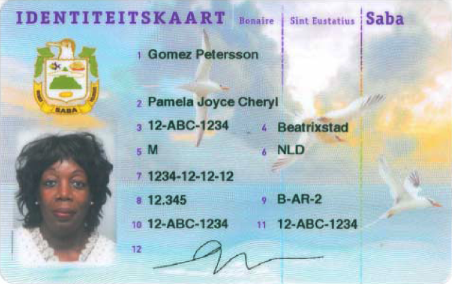
Identity card BES: version for Saba

The Identity card BES (locally also known as sedula) is a uniform identity card for residents in the Caribbean Netherlands introduced upon the dissolution of the Netherlands Antilles in 2010. The cards are machine-readable and have the size of a credit card. The front contains the words Identiteitskaart (English: Identity card) followed by the island names Bonaire, Sint Eustatius and Saba (with the name of the island where the card is issued in larger font and bold face). The card also contains the coat of arms of the island of issue.

== Legal basis ==
The legal basis is the Dutch law on BES identity cards (Dutch: Wet identiteitskaarten BES) which is derived from the corresponding law on the Netherlands Antilles (Dutch: Landsverordening Identiteitskaarten).

The card is valid only in the Caribbean Netherlands, not in the European Netherlands.

== Physical appearance ==
The card contains 12 numbered fields on the front with explanation on the back in Dutch, English, and Papiamento:

1. Surname
2. Given names
3. Date of Birth
4. Place of Birth
5. Sex
6. Nationality (for Dutch: NLD, the card is also issued to non-Dutch residents)
7. ID number
8. Card Number
9. Status
10. Date of Issue
11. Date of Expiry
12. Signature

The machine-readable strip starts with I<NLD as does the Dutch identity card.

== Relation to other identity cards ==
The identity card of the Netherlands Antilles issued in Bonaire was machine-readable upon transition, whereas cards issued on Sint Eustatius and Saba were older and less secure. The last of those cards expired by 1 July 2011. Furthermore, the possibility will be investigated to replace the card by the Dutch identity card.

== See also ==
- Dutch identity card
