= Burgerlijk Wetboek =

Dutch Civil Code

The Burgerlijk Wetboek (or BW) is the Civil Code of the Netherlands. Early versions were largely based on the Napoleonic Code. The Dutch Civil Code was substantively reformed in 1992. The Code deals with the rights of natural persons (Book 1), legal persons (Book 2), patrimony (Book 3) and succession (Book 4). It also sets out the law of property (e.g., ownership, possession, and security interests) (Book 5), obligations (Book 6) and contracts (Book 7), and conflict of laws (Book 10). Proposed amendments will add a Book on intellectual property.

The codification of laws is still being used in Indonesia as a pinnacle of the private laws besides Sharia law in Aceh and various other custom laws in certain regions. The laws initially applied only to Dutch settlers and foreign traders, such as Chinese traders, Indian traders and Arab traders during the Dutch colonial era in Dutch East Indies, but after the independence of Indonesia in 1945, the government decided to retain the old Dutch law, expanded in use to indigenous people and Muslims voluntarily. The 1992 reformed version does not apply in Indonesia.

== History ==
Before efforts at unification, almost every region and borough in the Netherlands had its own law. Local Roman-Dutch law borrowed heavily from the civilian ius commune, particularly with respect to the law of obligations and in the practice of written codes. However, no universal written code existed before the 19th century. Many attempts at codification were short-lived, not helped by constantly changing governments and political conditions. In 1531, Charles V, the ruler of the Netherlands, ordered the codification of existing laws with a view towards uniformity. However, the Eighty Years War and the end of Spanish rule in the Netherlands interrupted such plans. Some two centuries later, another attempt was made in 1801 under the new Batavian Republic. In 1804, a written code was partially drafted but never enacted. On 24 May 1806 the Netherlands became a French client state, styled the Kingdom of Holland under Napoleon's brother, Louis Bonaparte. The King was instructed by Napoleon to receive and enact the Napoleonic Code. A committee was formed and, drawing heavily from the Napoleonic Code and some previous work, a code—called the Wetboek Napoleon, ingerigt voor het Koningrijk Holland—was enacted by royal decree on 1 May 1809. Roman-Dutch law was abolished except where specifically retained by the Code and in the Dutch colonies. However, the 1809 enactment was short-lived. On 1 January 1811, the Netherlands was annexed by the French Empire and the Napoleonic Code was adopted in unmodified form. Dutch independence was restored with the collapse of French rule in 1813. The Kingdom once again pursued codification. Article 100 of the 1814 Constitution refers to a codification based on Dutch law. Various proposals were made between 1816 and 1830. Finally in 1830 a new code was enacted by Parliament. It was a mix of influences—mainly French and Roman-Dutch. This code was adopted as the Burgerlijk Wetboek of 1838.

== The 1838 Code, French influence and amendments ==
The 1838 Code entered into force on 1 October 1838. While it was substantially influenced by the Napoleonic Code, it did adopt some Roman-Dutch innovations. First, one might note differences in structure. Unlike the French model, the Dutch Code drew a strict contrast between real rights (rights in rem) and personal rights (rights in personam). Property provisions were arranged around the principle of ownership. Many differences in content also prevailed. On certain subjects, French law was either amended or repealed. Meijer identifies many key alterations. First, many French statutory provisions were removed. Meijer points to the removal of civil death, a concept which was wholly foreign to Dutch society. Other omissions can be seen where a legal concept was either culturally inappropriate or inconsistent with existing Dutch legal principles. Second, modifications were made to codify prior existing Roman-Dutch law or give effect to Roman-Dutch legal standards. For example, with regard to conveyancing, the 1838 Code did away with the Napoleonic solo contractu (aka solo consensu) doctrine and instead provided that a sales contract and delivery are separate legal acts, title to property must be valid, for delivery to be valid the contract must be valid, and all are required to transfer title. This codified the titulus-modus variant of the causal system of title transfer (causale stelsel van eigendomsoverdracht). However, it remained true that the 1838 Code did draw heavily from the Napoleonic Code, as Meijer concludes:

The French Code Civil was the model for the BW of 1838. This does not mean that the BW is a copy of the Code. It appears that the BW was not simply a translation. The BW is influenced by the Code Civil, but this does not justify the view that the Netherlands adopted French law. On the contrary: Some French rules were removed. Former Dutch law was inserted instead of the French rules or as a supplement to the BW. We find a large part of the Code is based on joint roots, and that the most important common background is Roman law.

Over the next century the Code was amended many times. In 1947, the Dutch government tasked Eduard Meijers with completely revising the Code. The 1838 Code was thought ‘out of date’ and in need of modernisation. The driving force was technical recodification; it was argued that the Code should be updated to reflect recent developments of private law.

== 1992 Code Reform ==
Despite the initial scope of revision being ‘technical reform’, the 1992 BW enacted substantive modifications to both the prior Code and established case law. The technical focus of the revised code is borrowed from the German BGB. The distinction between civil law and commercial law was done away with and brought under the broader ambit of private law. The Code now covers all aspects of commercial regulation—company, insurance, transport, consumer, and labour laws. For example, the 1992 Code now specifically regulates commercial contracts (Book 6, art. 119(a)). An unjust enrichment action is available (Book 6, art. 212), as are rescissory actions for vitiated consent or an ‘abuse of circumstances’ (Book 6, art. 44(4)). More generally, requirements of good faith now appear to be a constant theme throughout the Code: Book 6, art. 1 provides that parties in a legal relationship with each other are to behave equitably and reasonably towards each other. This appears to extend beyond contracts into other areas of law.

The 1992 Code is more technical, systematic, and abstract than its predecessor. It is also more conceptual, providing many well-defined principles at differing levels of abstraction. Throughout, the Code lays out a strict pattern of general rules upon which are built detailed ones. For example, tortious liability is founded on a general concept of civil wrong. The concept will have differing applications in different circumstances. The Code is also more nuanced, providing for degree and qualification where an ‘all or nothing’ approach may have prevailed under the prior Code. The Code also loosens the legal positivism of the French system in favour of granting courts wider discretion in adjudicating cases. This discretion permits ‘intermediate solutions’ (i.e. not slavishly statutory) to complex problems.

Like most other foreign civil codes, rules of procedure and public law are codified separately from the 1992 Civil Code.

== Criticisms ==
The Code has been criticised for affording too much discretion to courts. This, it is said, undermines certainty, a key aim of codification. On the other hand, flexibility allows the Code to meet new challenges without regular amendment. Further, the consolidation of a wide body of commercial law into the Code now makes it a ‘one-stop’ reference for private law and easily accessible and relevant to citizens and businesspeople alike.

== Structure ==
The Dutch Civil Code is presently composed of some 3,000 articles and 9 books:

Structure of the Burgerlijk Wetboek
Book	Description	Articles
1	Natural Persons and the Family	1:1 - 1:462
2	Legal Persons	2:1 - 2:455
3	Patrimony in General	3:1 - 3:326
4	Succession	4:1 - 4:233
5	Property	5:1 - 5:147
6	Obligations	6:1 - 6:279
7	Specific Contracts	7:1 - 7:9002
7A	Specific Contracts (not yet renewed)	7a:1576 - 7a:1828
8	Transport Law and Means of Transport	8:1 - 8:1836
9	Intellectual Property	(see other Acts)
10	Conflict of Laws	10:1 - 10:165

== See also ==
- Dutch Code of Civil Procedure (Dutch: Wetboek van Burgerlijke Rechtsvordering)
