= Dutch identity card =

National identity card of The Netherlands

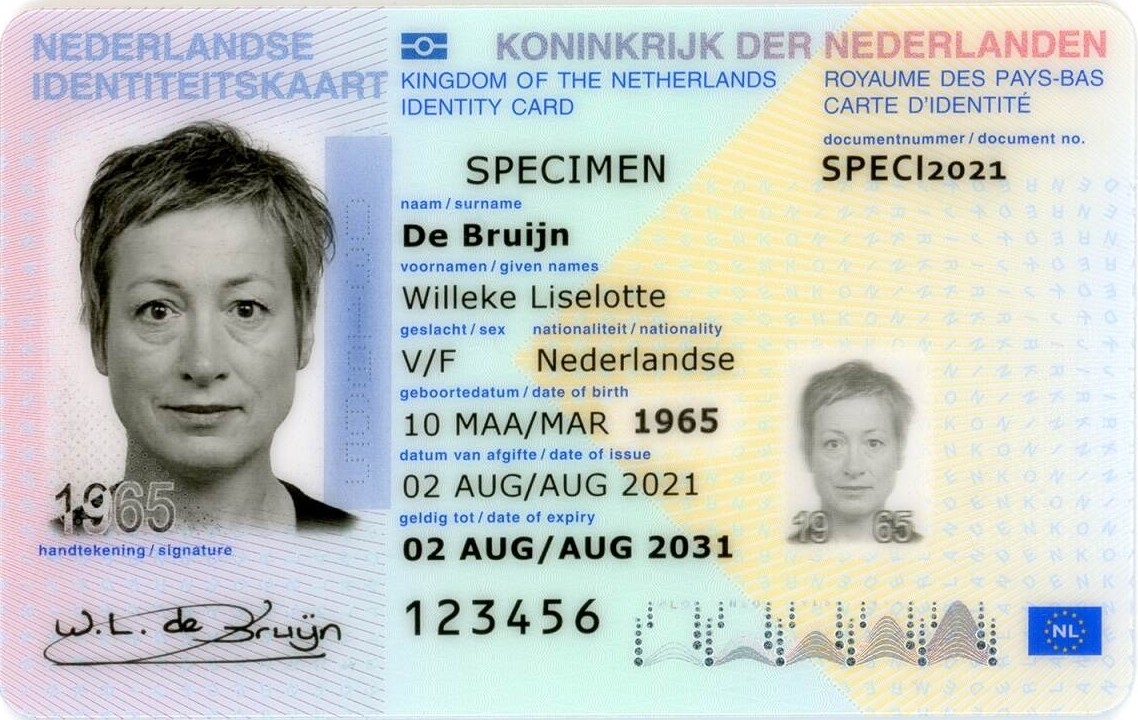

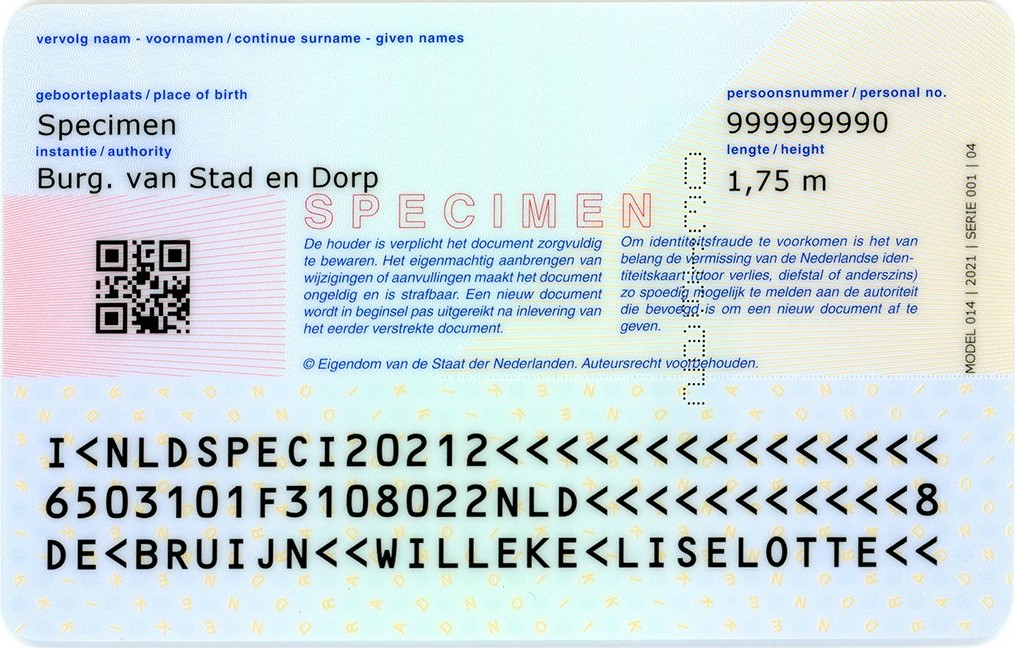
- Specimen of the credit-card sized Dutch identity card issued since 9 March 2014.
- Type: Identity card, travel document for passport in the listed countries
- Issued by: Netherlands
- Valid in: EFTA; European Union; United Kingdom (EU Settlement Scheme); Rest of Europe (except Belarus, Russia, and Ukraine) Georgia; Montserrat (max. 14 days); Overseas France; Turkey
- Expiration: 10 years after acquisition for adults and 5 years after acquisition for minors (since 9 March 2014)
- Cost: €75.80 (maximum rate; adults; individual municipalities determine the rate. €158.65 when living abroad.); €40.92 (maximum rate; minors; individual municipalities determine the rate. €121.80 when living abroad)

Dutch identity card, issued until 8 June 2012

The Dutch identity card (Dutch: nederlandse identiteitskaart [ˈneːdərlɑntsə ʔidɛntiˈtɛitskaːrt]) is an official non-compulsory identity document issued to Dutch nationals in the European part of the Netherlands and certain diplomatic missions. It has similar dimensions and structure as those of a regular bank card.

== Use ==
All Dutch citizens from the age of 14 are required to be able to show a valid identity document when the police or other enforcement officers ask for identification. The identity card is commonly used for this purpose, but other identity documents such as a passport or driving licence may be used instead.

The Dutch identity card is also a valid means of personal identification in a number of countries outside the Netherlands and may be used as a travel document in those countries in place of a Dutch passport.

== Identity information ==
A Dutch identity card includes the following information about the holder and the document (with fields in Dutch and English):

- Nationality (Nederlandse)
- Document number
- Full name, including surname and all given names
- Photograph (both printed and processed to watermark)
- Date of birth
- Place of birth
- Height
- Sex
- Personal number
- Authority (the authority who issued the concerning identity card, commonly the mayor of the municipality of residence; for example "Burgemeester van Utrecht")
- Date of issue
- Date of expiry (normally 10 years after the date of issue for adults, 5 years for minors)
- Signature
- Machine readable zone at the backside starts with I<NLD

As of 26 August 2006, newly issued identity cards are provided with a chip containing the information mentioned. Since May 2016, the identity card no longer contains the holder's fingerprints. The chip has been included due to European regulations.

== Validity ==
The Dutch identity card is a valid travel document within all of Europe (except Belarus, Russia, Ukraine and United Kingdom) as well as Georgia, Montserrat (max. 14 days), Turkey and on organised tours to Tunisia.

Validity in EU/EFTA states is based on membership of the European Union, while validity in Turkey is based on the "European Agreement on Regulations governing the Movement of Persons between Member States of the Council of Europe".

Since the document is defined within the Dutch Passport Law (Paspoortwet) as a "travel document of the European part of the Netherlands" rather than a "travel document of the Kingdom", this identity card is not issued or valid in the ABC islands or the SSS islands.

An identity card is normally valid for a period of 10 years for adults and 5 years for minors.

== European identity card ==
European identity card, issued until 1 October 2001

Before the introduction of the Dutch identity card (1 October 2001) in credit card format, an ID2-format European identity card was issued. This card was also machine-readable and was valid for the same group of countries (but not for 11 out of 12 EU countries which acceded in 2004 and 2007). The card contained also information on the bearer's address and had fields in English, Dutch and French. After introduction of the Dutch identity card, existing European identity cards remained valid until expiry.

== See also ==
- National identity cards in the European Economic Area
- Identity document
- Identity card BES
- Dutch passport
