= Dutch nationality law =

Nationality law of The Netherlands, Aruba, Curaçao, and Sint Maarten

Dutch Nationality Act Rijkswet op het Nederlanderschap

States General of the Netherlands
- Citation: Stb. 1984, 628.
- Territorial extent: Kingdom of the Netherlands (includes Aruba, Curaçao, the Netherlands, and Sint Maarten)
- Enacted by: States General of the Netherlands
- Royal assent: 19 December 1984
- Commenced: 1 January 1985
- Status: Amended

Dutch nationality law details the conditions by which a person holds Dutch nationality. The primary law governing these requirements is the Dutch Nationality Act, which came into force on 1 January 1985. Regulations apply to the entire Kingdom of the Netherlands, which includes the country of the Netherlands itself, Aruba, Curaçao, and Sint Maarten.

The Netherlands is a member state of the European Union (EU) and all Dutch nationals are EU citizens. They have automatic and permanent permission to live and work in any EU or European Free Trade Association (EFTA) country and may vote in elections to the European Parliament.

Any person born to at least one Dutch parent receives Dutch citizenship at birth. Foreign nationals may naturalise as Dutch citizens after living in any part of the Kingdom for at least five years, demonstrating proficiency in the Dutch language, renouncing any previous nationalities, and fulfilling a good character requirement.

== Acquisition of citizenship ==
=== By descent or automatic acquisition of Dutch nationality ===
A person born on or after 1 January 1985 to a Dutch father or mother (afstamming) is automatically a Dutch national at birth (van rechtswege). It is irrelevant where the child is born.

A child born to an unmarried Dutch father and a non-Dutch mother must be acknowledged by the Dutch father before birth, in order for the child to be a Dutch national at birth. Before 1 April 2003, an acknowledgement could be given after birth. Since then children who were not acknowledged before birth may nonetheless acquire Dutch citizenship through the option procedure, or through obtaining proof of paternity from a court. In the last case, the child gets Dutch nationality retroactively since the child's birth.

From 1 January 1985 the Kingdom Act on the Netherlands nationality (Rijkswet op het Nederlanderschap 19 December 1984, Stb. 628) permits children of either a Dutch father or mother to receive Dutch nationality by descent. Prior to that date Dutch nationality law (Wet op het Nederlanderschap en het ingezetenenschap (commonly abbreviated as WNI, 12 December 1892, Stb. 268) did not permit children to obtain Dutch nationality through descent from a Dutch mother (through matrilineal descent) and a non-Dutch father. Netherlands nationality was only passed through patrilineal (father) descent. Only if the father was not known or acknowledged did a child born to a Dutch mother receive Dutch nationality prior to 1 January 1985.

Between 1 January 1985 and 31 December 1987 children born after 1 January 1964 but before 1 January 1985 of a Dutch mother and non-Dutch father and who had never been married could use the ‘option procedure’ to acquire Dutch nationality. This possibility was not widely known and many in this situation missed the temporary opportunity to register themselves or their children as Dutch nationals.

In 2004, a number of these children of Dutch mothers and non-Dutch fathers (so-called "latent Dutch" or "latente Nederlanders") began to organise themselves in the hope of persuading the Dutch government that Article 27 of Rijkswet op het Nederlanderschap condones the discrimination against women enshrined in the earlier Dutch Nationality Law (before its 1985 revision), and it should therefore be revoked. In 2005, several Dutch lawyers agreed to take on the case and formalised the group into “Stichting Ne(e)derlanderschap Ja! ”. The legislative change was discussed by parliament in 2006, but then stalled when the government fell and the bill was withdrawn.

In December 2008, a new proposal was presented to the House of Representatives, and in January 2010 Legislative bill 31.831 (R1873) passed a majority vote amending the Kingdom Act on the Netherlands nationality to allow the so-called 'latent Dutch' to opt to receive Dutch nationality, regardless of their current age and marital status, and without requirement to renounce their original nationality. In June 2010, the Dutch Upper House approved the legislation. It was signed into law in July 2010 by Minister of Justice Mr Hirsch Ballin and H.M. the Queen, and published in the official Gazette issued by the Dutch Government (Staatsblad van het Koninkrijk der Nederlanden), with effect 1 October 2010. Latent Dutch now have the opportunity to receive Dutch nationality by option. Many latent Dutch regard themselves as having been Dutch since birth. However, while latent Dutch are by definition descended from a Dutch mother, nationality granted through the option procedure is not retroactive to the date of their birth. Under the law, these individuals are not considered to be Dutch since birth (van rechtswege), but rather are legally ‘Dutch by option’ from the date that the requirements of the ‘option procedure’ are fulfilled.

=== By option ===
The option procedure is a simpler and quicker way of acquiring Dutch citizenship compared to naturalisation. In effect, it is a form of simplified naturalisation.

In order to be eligible for the option procedure, it is necessary to hold a Dutch residence permit and to be any of the following:

- an adult who was born in the Netherlands, Aruba, Curaçao or Sint Maarten and who has lived in any of these places continuously since birth.
- a person born in the Netherlands, Aruba, Curaçao or Sint Maarten who has lived in any of these places for an uninterrupted period of at least three years and who has not acquired the citizenship of any other country (a stateless person).
- an adult who has been legally resident in the Netherlands, Aruba, Curaçao or Sint Maarten since he or she was four years old.
- an adult who used to be a Dutch national and who has been legally resident in the Netherlands, Aruba, Curaçao or Sint Maarten for at least one year and whose residence is without any restriction as to length.
- someone who has been married to a Dutch national for at least three years and who has been legally resident in the Netherlands, Aruba, Curaçao or Sint Maarten for an uninterrupted period of at least fifteen years.
- someone aged sixty-five years or over and who has been legally resident in the Netherlands, Aruba, Curaçao or Sint Maarten for an uninterrupted period of at least fifteen years.
- a minor who is acknowledged by a Dutch national who has been cared for and brought up by this Dutch national for an uninterrupted period of at least three years.
- a minor who, as a result of a Court decision or by law at the time of his or her birth, is under the joint custody of a non-Dutch parent and another person who is a Dutch national and who, since the start of this custody, has been cared for and brought up by this Dutch national for a period of at least three years during which the child has had his or her principal place of residence in the Netherlands.

Exception: Legislation 31.813 (R1873), inter alia, amends the Kingdom of the Netherlands' nationality law to allow latent Dutch to opt to receive Dutch nationality, effective 1 October 2010. The conditions of eligibility through the 'option procedure' differ somewhat from those described above. Eligibility criteria for Dutch nationality as a latent Dutch person are that the:

1. applicant was born before 1 January 1985;
2. mother was a Dutch national when the applicant was born;
3. father was not a Dutch national when the applicant was born;
4. applicant did not obtain Dutch nationality between 1 January 1985 and 31 December 1987 through the option procedure and then subsequently lost that Dutch nationality; and
5. applicant has no criminal record.

All five conditions must be met. If one or more of the conditions are not met the person is ineligible for nationality by this particular means under the recent changes to the option procedure affecting the latent Dutch. Residency in the Netherlands is not an eligibility requirement for latent Dutch applicants.

Applicants for Dutch citizenship through the option procedure are not required by Dutch law to renounce any foreign citizenship they might hold. However, the laws pertaining to their other citizenship may disagree.

=== Jus soli ===
Jus soli is the right of anyone born in the territory of a state to nationality or citizenship of that state. Dutch law has no provisions for the automatic granting of the Dutch nationality based on the actual place of birth, however, a child is Dutch if it was born to at least one parent, having his or her main residence in the Netherlands, Curaçao, Sint Maarten, or Aruba (or the Netherlands Antilles) at the times of the births of that parent and of the child, provided the child itself has at birth its main residence in one of those countries too.

A child found on Dutch territory (including ships and airplanes registered in the Netherlands), whose parents are unknown, is considered Dutch by birth if within five years since being found it does not become apparent that the child had another citizenship by birth.

=== By naturalisation ===
An application for Dutch citizenship by naturalisation must meet all the conditions below:

- Aged eighteen or over;
- Holder of a permanent resident permit or a valid residence permit with a non-temporary reason of stay (notably family formation or reunion gezinsvorming or gezinshereniging);
- Five years of continuous residence in the Netherlands, Aruba, Curaçao, or Sint Maarten with a valid residence permit prior to the application date. Residency under a temporary reason of stay (notably study) is also counted in those five years. There are a number of exceptions to this rule.
- Sufficiently integrated in Dutch society and are able to read, write, speak and understand Dutch. This must normally be proven by obtaining an "integration diploma" (inburgeringsdiploma), which requires tests on the Dutch language and Dutch society (kennis van de nederlandse maatschappij). Successful completion of an eligible integration course is an alternative. The Staatsexamen Nederlands als Tweede Taal diplomas NT2-I or NT2-II give their holder exemption from taking the naturalisation test. There are many other exemptions, see the Decision naturalisation test (Besluit naturalisatietoets) art. 3.
- Renounce any previous nationalities (unless exempt);
- In the five years preceding the application, the applicant has not been given any custodial sentence, training order, community service order or high monetary penalty.

Since 1 March 2009, anyone who requests naturalization must take an oath promising adherence to the values of the Dutch state: "I swear (declare) that I respect the constitutional order of the Kingdom of the Netherlands, its freedoms and its rights, and I swear (promise) to faithfully fulfil the obligations due to my nationality. So help me God Almighty", or: "This is what I promise and declare." According to Art. 23.3. of the Kingdom Act on the Netherlands Nationality, some categories of people are excepted from declaring their allegiance, through a general administrative measure. According to Art. 60a.6. of the Decree regarding the Obtention and Loss of the Netherlands Nationality, persons with a physical or psychological handicap who are unable to state their allegiance are exempted from doing so.

==== Exemptions to the residence requirement ====
The five-year residence requirement may not apply where the applicant falls into any of the following categories:

- a person adopted after majority in the Netherlands, Aruba, Curaçao, or Sint Maarten by parents at least one of whom has Dutch nationality.
- married to or are the registered partner of a Dutch man or Dutch woman. If this is the case, the person can submit an application for naturalisation after three years of marriage or registered partnership and cohabitation. If the person has cohabited in the Netherlands with a Dutch man or Dutch woman (both partners unmarried) for an uninterrupted period of three years, an application may also be submitted. Note: this is true in respect to marriage, partnership or cohabitation if and only if in the last three years the applicant has continually lived together with the partner inside the Netherlands. As a rule of thumb, for each passed year, more than six months per year must have been spent under the same roof with that partner. There is an extra clause, namely that the couple has to remain living under the same roof for as long as the request for naturalization is being researched.
- the five-year term is reduced to a three-year term if the applicant is stateless.
- the five-year term is reduced to a three-year term if the applicant as a minor is acknowledged or legitimised by a Dutch national and has been cared for and brought up by this Dutch national for a period of 3 years.
- the five-year term is reduced to a two-year term if the applicant has legally lived in the Netherlands, Aruba, Curaçao, or Sint Maarten for a period of ten years, the last two of which uninterruptedly.
- a former Dutch national. In some cases the applicant will instead be able to use the option procedure.

==== Exemptions to the requirement to renounce foreign citizenship ====
An applicant for naturalisation does not have to formally renounce their current nationality in the following cases:

- where the original nationality is automatically lost upon naturalisation as a Dutch national.
- the legislation of the applicant's country does not allow renunciation of nationality.
- the person is married to or the registered partner of a Dutch national.
- recognised refugees.
- born in the Netherlands, Aruba, Curaçao, or Sint Maarten, and still living there at the time of application (The applicant does not have to have lived within the Kingdom their entire life).
- where the applicant cannot be expected to contact the authorities in the country of which they are a national.
- where the applicant has "special and objectively assessable reasons" for not renouncing his existing nationality.
- where, in order to give up the current nationality, the applicant would have to fulfil military service obligations or pay for such military service instead of fulfilling it, which must be demonstrated in each case.
- where renunciation of the applicant's existing nationality would cause "serious financial losses" (for example, inheritance rights), which must be demonstrated.
- where, in order to give up the applicant's current nationality, the applicant must pay a large sum of money to the authorities in his or her country.

These exemptions do not hold for Austrian nationals, since Austria (together with the Netherlands) is party to Chapter I of the Convention on the Reduction of Cases of Multiple Nationality and on Military Obligations in Cases of Multiple Nationality (see Chapter I, art. 1, paragraph 1). This was also the case for nationals of Belgium, Denmark, Luxembourg, and Norway, who were parties to the Convention, but have renounced Chapter I of the Convention on different dates.

==== Children ====
Children aged under eighteen may be added to a parent's application for Dutch citizenship. Those aged sixteen and seventeen will only be naturalised if they give their active consent while those aged twelve through fifteen inclusive are given a chance to object.

=== By resumption ===
Former Dutch nationals who hold permanent resident permits (or other residence permits that serve a non-temporary purpose) and have resided in the Kingdom of the Netherlands (Netherlands, Aruba, Curaçao, or Sint Maarten) for at least one year may regain Dutch citizenship through the option procedure.

Where the person is not resident in the Kingdom of the Netherlands, the person must have lost Dutch citizenship after reaching the age of majority and through the acquisition of another citizenship. In addition one of the following conditions must be satisfied:

- born in the country whose nationality was acquired and living there at the time of acquisition of the nationality of that country, or
- before turning eighteen, lived in the country whose nationality was acquired for an uninterrupted period of at least five years, or
- at the time of acquisition of the nationality of the other country, the person was married to someone who possessed that nationality.

These criteria are similar to the criteria for exemption from loss of Dutch citizenship in place since 1 April 2003. If a former Dutch national lost Dutch nationality prior to 31 March 2003 under one of the three conditions above, that individual may submit an application to regain Dutch nationality through option. The application opting for Dutch nationality may be submitted up to 31 March 2013 (i.e., ten years from the 2003 change in the law).

== Loss of Dutch citizenship ==
Dutch nationals may lose their citizenship through long residence outside the Netherlands while having more than one nationality, or acquisition of a foreign nationality. In addition, in some cases it is possible to be deprived of Dutch citizenship.

=== By residence outside the Netherlands ===
The Dutch law has contained for many years provisions that removed Dutch citizenship from certain Dutch persons who held another nationality at birth and remained resident outside the Netherlands in adulthood.

==== Prior to 1985 ====
Before 1 January 1985, Dutch nationals lost their nationality in cases where they were born outside the Kingdom of the Netherlands, lived for an uninterrupted period of ten years outside the Kingdom after reaching the age of majority (then twenty-one) and did not submit notification that they wished to retain their Dutch nationality before the period of ten years.

These provisions affected Dutch nationals born abroad before 1 January 1954.

==== 1985–2003 ====
Under the 1985 legislation, Dutch nationals born outside the Netherlands who also held the nationality of the country of their birth lost Dutch citizenship if they lived in the country of their birth for ten years after they turn 18 (and were still citizens or nationals of their country of birth).

Those who were issued a Dutch passport or proof of Dutch citizenship on or after 1 January 1990 are deemed never to have lost Dutch citizenship. This exemption was put in place on 1 February 2001.

Former nationals who were not issued a Dutch passport or proof of Dutch citizenship in 1990 or later were given a limited period of time to acquire Dutch citizenship by option, until 31 March 2005.

==== Since 2003 ====
Since 1 April 2003, following an amendment to the Netherlands Nationality Act of 1985, Dutch nationals with dual nationality will lose their Dutch citizenship if they hold a foreign citizenship and reside outside the Kingdom of the Netherlands and the European Union for ten years.

In the case of Dutch nationals who possessed dual nationality on 1 April 2003 and who were then resident outside the Kingdom of the Netherlands and the European Union, the ten years started on 1 April 2003.

The amendment lets Dutch nationals who hold foreign citizenship and reside abroad keep their citizenship by either having a principal residence in the Netherlands or another EU member state for at least a year or applying for a Dutch passport or proof of Dutch nationality before the end of the relevant ten year period. A new period of ten years starts on the day that the person is issued with a passport or proof of Dutch nationality.

=== By acquisition of another citizenship ===
A person over the age of majority who voluntarily acquired another citizenship before 1 April 2003 automatically lost Dutch citizenship.

From 1 April 2003, loss of Dutch citizenship upon naturalisation in another country is still automatic unless at least one of the following exemptions applies:

- the person is born in the country of the other nationality and has a principal residence there at the time of acquisition of that nationality.
- if before turning 18, the person has had a principal residence in the country of the other nationality for an uninterrupted period of five years;
- if the person is married to another person who possesses the nationality that the Dutch person wishes to acquire.

If a person already lost Dutch nationality under these three exceptions prior to 1 April 2003, the final date to regain Dutch nationality under these three exceptions was 1 April 2013. Since then, it is no longer possible to reacquire Dutch nationality by option under these three exceptions if the person had already lost Dutch nationality prior to 1 April 2003. The only way to regain Dutch nationality is by naturalisation. These exemptions do not apply in the case of acquisition of Austrian, Norwegian or Danish citizenship. Before 28 April 2008, those exemptions did not apply to obtaining Belgian nationality. Before 10 July 2009, these exemptions did not apply to getting the Luxembourgeois nationality. This is due to the provisions of the Convention on the Reduction of Cases of Multiple Nationality, to which the Netherlands became party in 1985.

Other exceptions also exist such as the one in which minors who naturalise independently from their parents will not lose their Dutch citizenship. That was particularly helpful prior to 1985, when the age of majority was 21.

The exemptions lead to internal problems in the case of acquisition of Japanese or South Korean citizenship since neither Japan nor South Korea allows its nationals to hold foreign citizenships in their adult years (though limited exceptions exist in South Korea, and Japan requires renunciation of the foreign citizenship within two years). Dutch nationals are not allowed to renounce their nationality if they become stateless so this renunciation has to occur while they have dual nationality, which is illegal in Japan and South Korea. Therefore, acquiring Japanese or South Korean nationality cannot be done by exempted Dutch nationals without breaking the laws of such countries.

=== By deprivation ===
Dutch citizenship by naturalization may be withdrawn if procured by fraud or if the naturalized Dutch national does not renounce a foreign citizenship as per the requirements for naturalization (if one did not have the right to be exempted from such requirement or if one did not claim one's right to such exemption before signing a paper wherein one agrees to renounce the original nationality). A similar requirement exists for citizens of Japan and South Korea (see above). Withdrawal based on fraud is not allowed after twelve years unless the person is convicted of war crimes, genocide, or torture.

Dutch citizenship will also be revoked in the case of service in a foreign army at war with the Netherlands or one of its allies.

The possibility to reapply for lost Dutch nationality under those three exceptions expired on 31 March 2013.

=== By joining jihadist groups ===
On 29 August 2014, Dutch ministers, in their effort to discourage young Dutch Muslims from joining terrorist organisations involved in a war with the Netherlands or one of its allies, planned to increase the options of withdrawing Dutch citizenship from dual nationals. This will be extended to the people who train in terrorist camps or work in them as instructors.

In addition, passports of people suspected of making plans to travel to a conflict zone and join a terrorist organisation like ISIL may be declared invalid.

== Dual citizenship ==
Although Dutch law restricts dual citizenship, it is possible for Dutch nationals to legally hold dual citizenship in a number of circumstances, including:

- those who acquire another citizenship at the time of birth (for example, a child born to Dutch parents in the United States would hold both US and Dutch citizenship).
- persons who acquire Dutch citizenship through the option procedure (including former Dutch citizens resuming citizenship)
- persons who become naturalised Dutch nationals if they obtain an exemption from the requirement to renounce their foreign citizenship, such as those who are married to Dutch nationals.
- Dutch nationals who naturalise in another country who are exempted from the loss of nationality rule, such as those married to a national of that country.

=== Dispute ===
Dutch nationality law is an object of enduring dispute, dissension and debate, since the electoral campaign of Pim Fortuyn turned immigration into a hot issue in Dutch politics. Since the assassination of Pim Fortuyn, anti-immigration politicians like Geert Wilders and Rita Verdonk have opposed dual citizenship.

== Citizenship of the European Union ==
Because the Netherlands forms part of the European Union, Dutch citizens are also citizens of the European Union under European Union law and thus enjoy rights of free movement and have the right to vote in elections for the European Parliament. When in a non-EU country where there is no Dutch embassy, Dutch citizens have the right to get consular protection from the embassy of any other EU country present in that country. Dutch citizens can live and work in any country within the EU as a result of the right of free movement and residence granted in Article 21 of the EU Treaty.

== Brexit implications ==
The consequences of the UK's departure from the EU (Brexit) will affect Dutch nationals in the UK and British nationals in the Netherlands. This prospective loss of their original or dual nationality has encouraged many to support the European Citizens' Initiative for Permanent European Union Citizenship.

== Former territories ==
Before independence, Dutch citizenship was held by many persons in Suriname and Indonesia. In general, those acquiring citizenship of these countries at independence have lost their Dutch citizenship, but a request for determination of citizenship status can be addressed to the Dutch authorities.

== Dutch citizenship statistics ==
Figures from the Dutch government show that approximately 11,500 people were granted Dutch citizenship by naturalisation in the first six months of 2003. There were close to 20,000 applications.

According to the country's statistics office, nearly 21,000 people were granted Dutch nationality through naturalisation in 2004 (13,000 adults and 8,000 children at the same time). This is 4,000 fewer than in 2003 and half the number in 2002.

== Travel freedom of Dutch citizens ==
Visa requirements for Dutch citizens Netherlands Freedom of movement Visa not required Visa on arrival eVisa Visa available both on arrival or online Visa required prior to arrival

Visa requirements for Dutch citizens are administrative entry restrictions by the authorities of other states placed on citizens of the Netherlands. As of 18 January 2022, Dutch citizens had visa-free or visa on arrival access to 188 countries and territories, ranking the Dutch passport 4th in terms of travel freedom according to the Henley visa restrictions index.

The Dutch nationality is ranked second in The Quality of Nationality Index (QNI). This index differs from the Henley Passport Index, which focuses on external factors including travel freedom. The QNI considers in addition to travel freedom on internal factors such as peace & stability, economic strength, human development as well.

== See also ==
- History of Dutch nationality
- Latent Dutch (Latente Dutch)
