= Visa requirements for Venezuelan citizens =

Administrative entry restrictions

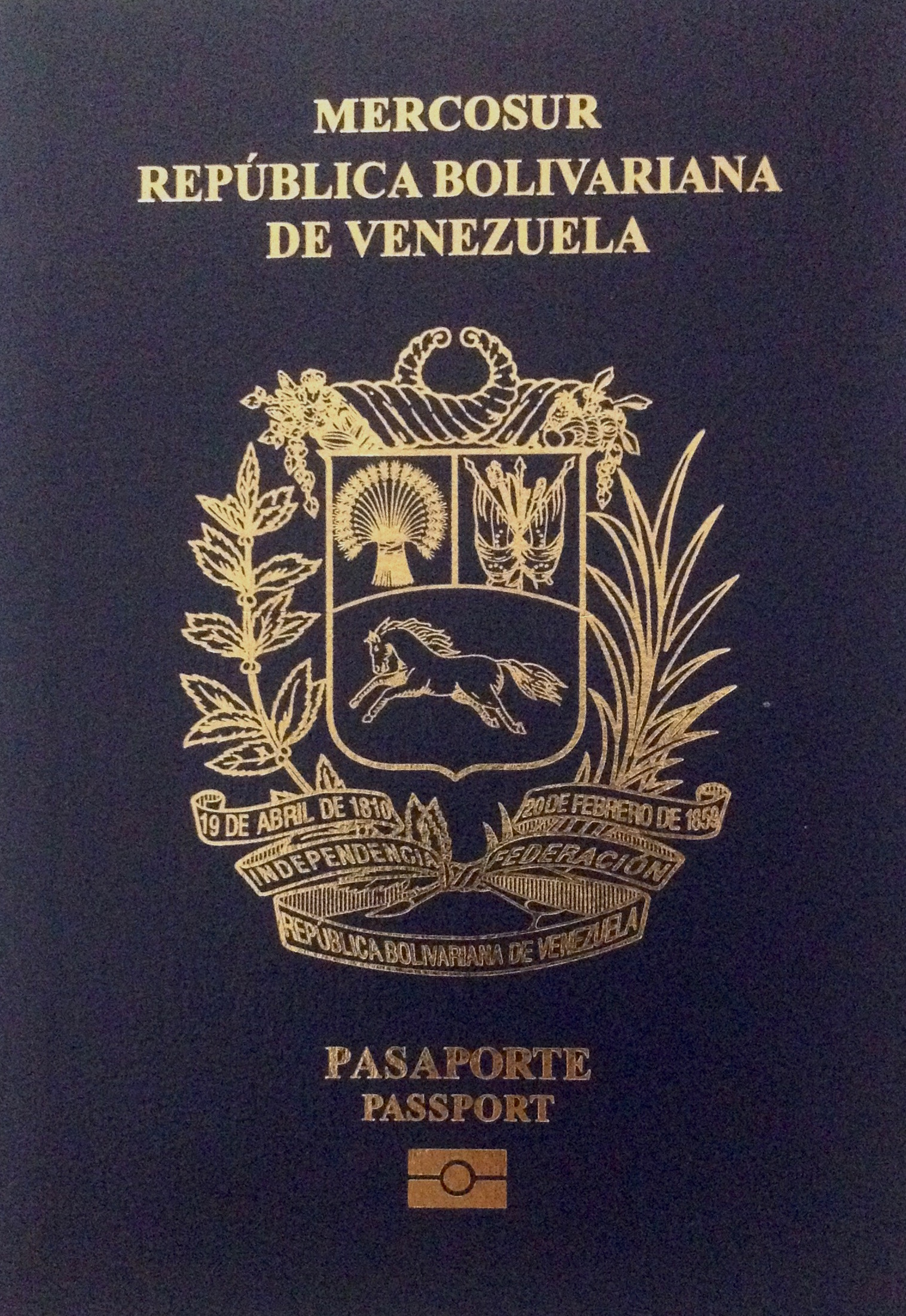
A Venezuelan passport

Visa requirements for Venezuelan citizens are administrative entry restrictions by the authorities of other states placed on citizens of Venezuela.

As of 2026, Venezuelan citizens have visa-free or visa on arrival access to 116 countries and territories, ranking the Venezuelan passport 43rd in the world according to the Henley Passport Index.

Citizens of Venezuela do not need to use a passport when traveling to Argentina, Brazil, and Colombia as they may use their ID card. Moreover, Venezuelans may also travel to the United States, Canada, Spain and several Latin American countries using expired passports.

Since 2017, 24 countries in Latin America and Caribbean (El Salvador, Paraguay, Panama, Honduras, Guatemala, Saint Lucia, Peru, Trinidad and Tobago, Chile, Cuba, Ecuador, Dominican Republic, Aruba, Bonaire, Curaçao, Sint Maarten, Sint Eustatius, Saba, Mexico, Costa Rica, Belize, Nicaragua, Suriname and Cayman Islands) have stopped providing visa-free access to Venezuelans following the ongoing refugee crisis and reinstated visa requirements for those seeking to enter these countries.

Some countries will still allow Venezuelans to enter visa-free if holding a valid visa / residence permit from a particular third country, such as Canada, the Schengen Area, Japan or the United States; and in the case of Mexico offers visa-free if holding a residence from a country of the Pacific Alliance (Chile, Colombia and Peru). Venezuela can enter Mexico without visa if they hold invitation up to 180 days

== Visa requirements map ==
Visa requirements for Venezuelan citizens holding ordinary passports Venezuela ID card Visa not required Visa on arrival eVisa Visa available both on arrival or online Visa required

== Visa requirements ==
Visa requirements for holders of normal passports traveling for tourist purposes:
The identity cards are only to the Argentina, based on principles of reciprocity.

| Country | Visa requirement | Allowed stay | Notes (excluding departure fees) |
|---|---|---|---|
| Afghanistan | eVisa | | Visa is not required in case born in Afghanistan or can proof that one of their parents is a national of Afghanistan or born in Afghanistan.; e-Visa : Visitors must arrive at Kabul International (KBL). |
| Albania | Visa not required | 90 days | |
| Algeria | Visa required | | Visa Issuance for passengers with a boarding authorization traveling as tourists to cities in the south of Algeria (Timimoun, Ghardaia, Ilizi, Djanet or Tamanraset) can obtain a visa on arrival for a maximum of 30 days. They must have: a return/onward ticket, a hotel reservation confirmation. |
| Andorra | Visa not required | | |
| Angola | eVisa | 30 days | 30 days per trip, but no more than 90 days within any 1 calendar year for tourism purposes only.; Visitors must have a return/onward ticket and a hotel reservation confirmation.; An International Certificate of Vaccination is required. |
| Antigua and Barbuda | Visa not required | 180 days | |
| Argentina | Freedom of movement (conditional) | 90 days | Native citizens of Venezuela may visit Argentina, who are outside the Argentine Republic, and enter the country regularly as of September 20, 2024 (However, they can only use a passport of an expired ID card for 90 days), doing a formality, and paying ARS 50000 (ARS 6000 for the Argentine Identity card).; Identity card valid. |
| Armenia | eVisa | 120 days | Visa on arrival if holing a valid residence permit or valid visa issued by the EU and Schengen member states, the USA, Australia, New Zealand, the Republic of Korea, the UK, Canada, the Russian Federation, or Japan or a valid residence permit (physical card or sticker) issued by the United Arab Emirates, Saudi Arabia, Kuwait, Qatar, Bahrain or Oman. |
| Australia and territories | Online Visa required | 90 days | May apply online (Online Visitor e600 visa). |
| Austria | Visa not required | 90 days | 90 days within any 180 day period in the Schengen Area. |
| Azerbaijan | Visa required | | Visa not required for a max. stay of 30 days for holders of a valid residence permit issued by a GCC Member State. |
| Bahamas | Visa not required | 3 months | |
| Bahrain | eVisa / Visa on arrival | 14 days | |
| Bangladesh | Visa on arrival | 30 days | Not available at all entry points. |
| Barbados | Visa not required | 28 days | |
| Belarus | Visa not required | 90 days | |
| Belgium | Visa not required | 90 days | 90 days within any 180 day period in the Schengen Area. |
| Belize | Visa required | | |
| Benin | eVisa | 30 days | Must have an international vaccination certificate. |
| Bhutan | eVisa | | |
| Bolivia | Visa not required | 90 days | |
| Bosnia and Herzegovina | Visa not required | 90 days | 90 days within any 6-month period. |
| Botswana | Visa not required | 90 days | 90 days within any year period. |
| Brazil | Visa not required | 90 days | |
| Brunei | Visa required | | |
| Bulgaria | Visa not required | 90 days | 90 days within any 180 day period in the Schengen Area. |
| Burkina Faso | eVisa / Visa on arrival | 1 month | |
| Burundi | Visa on arrival | 1 month | |
| Cambodia | eVisa / Visa on arrival | 30 days | |
| Cameroon | eVisa | | |
| Canada | Visa required | | Provisional passports issued by Venezuela are not accepted.; eTA required if arriving by air from 10 November 2016 for US permanent resident card holders. U.S. permanent residents need an eTA to fly to or transit through a Canadian airport, and they must present a valid Green Card and a valid passport at check-in. All U.S. Green Card holders are visa-exempt to enter Canada. |
| Cape Verde | Visa on arrival | | Not available at all entry points. |
| Central African Republic | Visa required | | |
| Chad | Visa required | | |
| Chile | Visa required | | Visa requirement effective on 22 June 2019. |
| China | Visa required | | |
| Colombia | Visa not required | 180 days | 90 days - extendable up to 180-days stay within a one-year period. |
| Comoros | Visa on arrival | 45 days | |
| Republic of the Congo | Visa required | | |
| Democratic Republic of the Congo | eVisa | 7 days | |
| Costa Rica | Visa required | | |
| Côte d'Ivoire | eVisa | 3 months | e-Visa holders must arrive via Port Bouet Airport. |
| Croatia | Visa not required | 90 days | 90 days within any 180 day period in the Schengen Area |
| Cuba | eVisa | 90 days | Can be extended up to 90 days with a fee. |
| Cyprus | Visa not required | 90 days | 90 days within any 180 day period |
| Czech Republic | Visa not required | 90 days | 90 days within any 180 day period in the Schengen Area |
| Denmark | Visa not required | 90 days | 90 days within any 180 day period in the Schengen Area |
| Djibouti | eVisa | 90 days | |
| Dominica | Visa not required | 6 months | |
| Dominican Republic | Visa required | | Visa requirement effective on 16 December 2019.; Visa not required for holders of a valid visa issued by Canada, USA or a Schengen Member State. |
| Ecuador | Visa required | | Visa requirement effective on 25 August 2019. |
| Egypt | eVisa/Visa on arrival | 30 days | |
| El Salvador | Visa required | | Visa not required for holders of a valid visa issued by Canada, USA or a Schengen Member State |
| Equatorial Guinea | eVisa | | |
| Eritrea | Visa required | | |
| Estonia | Visa not required | 90 days | 90 days within any 180 day period in the Schengen Area. |
| Eswatini | Visa required | | |
| Ethiopia | eVisa | up to 90 days | e-Visa holders must arrive via Addis Ababa Bole International Airport |
| Fiji | Visa not required | 4 months | |
| Finland | Visa not required | 90 days | 90 days within any 180 day period in the Schengen Area |
| France | Visa not required | 90 days | 90 days within any 180 day period in the Schengen Area |
| Gabon | eVisa | 90 days | e-Visa holders must arrive via Libreville International Airport. |
| Gambia | Visa required | 90 days | |
| Georgia | Visa required | | Visa not required for up to 90 days if traveler holds a valid Canada, Schengen, UK or US visa or a Canada, Schengen, EU or US residence permit. |
| Germany | Visa not required | 90 days | 90 days within any 180 day period in the Schengen Area |
| Ghana | Visa required | | |
| Greece | Visa not required | 90 days | 90 days within any 180 day period in the Schengen Area |
| Grenada | Visa not required | 90 days | Extensions possible. |
| Guatemala | Visa required | | Visa requirement effective on 19 March 2018. |
| Guinea | eVisa | 90 days | |
| Guinea-Bissau | Visa on arrival | 90 days | |
| Guyana | Visa required | | Tourists can obtain a visa on arrival for a maximum stay of 30 days. |
| Haiti | Visa not required | 3 months | |
| Honduras | Visa required | | Visa requirement effective on 20 November 2017. |
| Hungary | Visa not required | 90 days | 90 days within any 180 day period in the Schengen Area |
| Iceland | Visa not required | 90 days | 90 days within any 180 day period in the Schengen Area |
| India | eVisa | 30 days | e-Visa holders must arrive via 32 designated airports (Note: Ahmedabad; Amritsar; Bagdogra; Bengaluru; Bhubaneswar; Chandigarh; Chennai; Coimbatore; Delhi; Gaya; Goa-Dabolim; Goa-Manohar; Guwahati; Hyderabad; Indore; Jaipur; Kannur; Kochi; Kolkata; Kozhikode; Lucknow; Madurai; Mangaluru; Mumbai; Nagpur; Port Blair; Pune; Surat; Thiruvananthapuram; Tiruchirappalli; Varanasi; Visakhapatnam) or 5 designated seaports. (Note: Chennai; Cochin; Mormugao (Goa); Mumbai; Mangalore); An Indian e-Tourist Visa may only be obtained twice within 1 calendar year.; Foreigners of Pakistani origin or who hold a Pakistani Passport are not eligible for an e-Visa. Foreigners who are not Pakistani nationals, but whose parents or grandparents (either paternal or maternal) were born in, or were permanent residents in Pakistan, are also not eligible for an e-Visa. |
| Indonesia | e-VOA / Visa on arrival | 30 days | |
| Iran | Visa not required | 30 days | |
| Iraq | eVisa | | |
| Ireland | Visa required | | May transit without a visa. |
| Israel | Visa required | | |
| Italy | Visa not required | 90 days | 90 days within any 180 day period in the Schengen Area. |
| Jamaica | Visa not required | 30 days | |
| Japan | Visa required | | Eligible for an e-Visa if residing in one these countries Australia, Brazil, Cambodia, Canada, India, Saudi Arabia, Singapore, South Africa, Taiwan, United Arab Emirates, United Kingdom, United States.; May apply online |
| Jordan | eVisa / Visa on arrival | | Visa can be obtained upon arrival, it will cost a total of 40 JOD, obtainable at most international ports of entry and land border crossings. (except King Hussein/Allenby Bridge) |
| Kazakhstan | eVisa | | |
| Kenya | Electronic Travel Authorisation | 90 days | Applications can be submitted up to 90 days prior to travel and must be submitted at least 3 days in advance.; eTA fee is 32.50 USD.; Proof of reservation at the hotel where visitors plan to stay is required (if staying with friends, an invitation letter is also acceptable).; Yellow fever vaccination certificate is required if coming from endemic countries. |
| Kiribati | Visa not required | 90 days | 90 days within any 12-month period. |
| North Korea | Visa required | | |
| South Korea | Electronic Travel Authorization | 90 days | The validity period of a K-ETA is 3 years from the date of approval. |
| Kuwait | Visa required | | |
| Kyrgyzstan | eVisa / Visa on arrival | 1 month | Visa on arrival available at Manas International Airport.; e-Visa holders must arrive via Manas International Airport or Osh Airport or through land crossings with China (at Irkeshtam and Torugart), Kazakhstan (at Ak-jol, Ak-Tilek, Chaldybar, Chon-Kapka), Tajikistan (at Bor-Dobo, Kulundu, Kyzyl-Bel) and Uzbekistan (at Dostuk). |
| Laos | eVisa / Visa on arrival | 30 days | 18 (Note: Savannakhet Airport; Lanetoui - Mengkang (China); Meuangmom - Wan Pong (Myanmar); Banvang - Ban Khok Phai (Thailand); Namngeun - Huay Kon (Thailand); Paksan - Bueng Kan (Thailand); Paktaphan - Pak Saeng (Thailand); Pangmon - Ban Huak (Thailand); Phoudou (Thailand); Dak ta ock - Nam Giang (Vietnam); La Lai (Vietnam); Namkan (Vietnam); Namphao - Cau Treo (Vietnam); Namsoy - Na Meo (Vietnam); Naphao - Cha Lo (Vietnam); Pahang - Long Sap (Vietnam); Panghok - Tây Trang (Vietnam); Phoukeua - Bo Y (Vietnam)) of the 33 border crossings are only open to regular visa holders.; e-Visa may be used to enter Laos through the Luang Prabang, Pakse and Vientiane international airports, 3 Thai-Lao Friendship Bridges (Note: Vientiane (Friendship Bridge 1); Savannakhet (Friendship Bridge 2); Bokeo (Friendship Bridge 4)), in Boten (road and railroad), and in Vientiane (at Khamsavath railway station).; Visa on arrival is available at the Luang Prabang, Pakse and Vientiane international airports, 4 Thai-Lao Friendship Bridges (Note: Vientiane (Friendship Bridge 1); Savannakhet (Friendship Bridge 2); Khammouane (Friendship Bridge 3); Bokeo (Friendship Bridge 4)) and 7 border crossings. (Note: Nongnokkheane - Trapeang Kriel (Cambodia); Boten - Bo han (China); Golden Triangle/Samliemkham (Thailand); Khamsavath railway station (Thailand); Namheuang - Ban Na Kraseng (Thailand); Vang tao - Chongmek (Thailand); Dansavan - Lao Bảo (Vietnam)) |
| Latvia | Visa not required | 90 days | 90 days within any 180 day period in the Schengen Area. |
| Lebanon | Free visa on arrival | 1 month | 1 month extendable for 2 additional months; Granted free of charge at Beirut International Airport or any other port of entry if there is no Israeli visa or seal, holding a telephone number, an address in Lebanon, and a non refundable return or circle trip ticket. |
| Lesotho | eVisa | | |
| Liberia | eVisa | | |
| Libya | eVisa | | |
| Liechtenstein | Visa not required | 90 days | 90 days within any 180 day period in the Schengen Area. |
| Lithuania | Visa not required | 90 days | 90 days within any 180 day period in the Schengen Area. |
| Luxembourg | Visa not required | 90 days | 90 days within any 180 day period in the Schengen Area. |
| Madagascar | eVisa / Visa on arrival | | |
| Malawi | eVisa / Visa on arrival | 30 days | |
| Malaysia | Visa not required | 30 days | |
| Maldives | Free visa on arrival | 30 days | |
| Mali | Visa required | | |
| Malta | Visa not required | 90 days | 90 days within any 180 day period in the Schengen Area. |
| Marshall Islands | Visa required | | |
| Mauritania | eVisa | | Available at Nouakchott–Oumtounsy International Airport. |
| Mauritius | Visa on arrival | 60 days | |
| Mexico | Visa required | | Visa not required for holders of a valid visa or permanent residence issued by the United States, Canada, Chile, Colombia, Japan, United Kingdom, or Schengen area. Visa requirement effective on January 21, 2022. |
| Micronesia | Visa not required | 30 days | |
| Moldova | Visa not required | 90 days | 90 days within any 180 day period. |
| Monaco | Visa not required | | |
| Mongolia | eVisa | 30 days | |
| Montenegro | Visa not required | 90 days | |
| Morocco | Visa required | | Holders of a visa or residence permit from European Union, United States of America, Australia, Canada, United Kingdom, Japan, Norway, New Zealand and Switzerland valid for 90 days (or 180 days for residence permits) on application, can apply for an eVisa for 30 days. Passport must also be valid for 90 days. |
| Mozambique | eVisa / Visa on arrival | 30 days | |
| Myanmar | eVisa | 28 days | e-Visa holders must arrive via Yangon, Nay Pyi Taw or Mandalay airports or via land border crossings with Thailand — Tachileik, Myawaddy and Kawthaung or India — Rih Khaw Dar and Tamu.; e-Visa is available for tourism only. |
| Namibia | Visa on arrival | 3 months | Available at Hosea Kutako International Airport. |
| Nauru | Visa required | | |
| Nepal | Online Visa / Visa on arrival | 90 days | |
| Netherlands | Visa not required | 90 days | 90 days within any 180 day period in the Schengen Area. |
| New Zealand | Visa required | | May transit without visa if transit is through Auckland Airport and for no longer than 24 hours, subject to meeting character requirements and obtaining an Electronic Travel Authority prior to departure.; Holders of an Australian Permanent Resident Visa or Resident Return Visa may be granted a New Zealand Resident Visa on arrival permitting indefinite stay (pursuant to the Trans-Tasman Travel Arrangement), subject to meeting character requirements and obtaining an Electronic Travel Authority prior to departure. |
| Nicaragua | Visa required | | |
| Niger | Visa required | | |
| Nigeria | eVisa | 90 days | |
| North Macedonia | Visa not required | 90 days | |
| Norway | Visa not required | 90 days | 90 days within any 180 day period in the Schengen Area. |
| Oman | Visa not required / eVisa | 14 days / 30 days | |
| Pakistan | Online Visa | 3 months | Online Visa eligible. |
| Palau | Free visa on arrival | 30 days | |
| Panama | Visa required | | Visa requirement effective on 1 October 2017.; No Visa Required for 30 days if Exception applies as follows: Holding a Visa or Permanent Resident Permit duly issued by the United States of America, Commonwealth of Australia, Canada, Republic of Korea (South Korea), State of Japan, the United Kingdom of Great Britain and Northern Ireland, Republic of Singapore, or a Schengen Visa from any member state of the European Union, (i) granted for multiple entries and exits; (ii) that has been used at least once to enter the territory of the granting State; and (iii) with a validity of at least one (1) year, may enter the national territory without the requirement of a Stamped Visa (Executive Decree No. 521 6 August 2018, replacing Executive Decree No. 591 28 December 2016 and Executive Decree No. 114 4 April 2018). Transit visa is not required if connection time is under 12 hours. |
| Papua New Guinea | eVisa | 60 days | Visitors may apply for a visa online under the "Tourist - Own Itinerary" category. |
| Paraguay | Visa required | | |
| Peru | Visa required | | Visa requirement effective on 15 June 2019. |
| Philippines | Visa not required | 30 days | |
| Poland | Visa not required | 90 days | 90 days within any 180 day period in the Schengen Area. |
| Portugal | Visa not required | 90 days | 90 days within any 180 day period in the Schengen Area. |
| Qatar | Visa not required | 30 days | |
| Romania | Visa not required | 90 days | 90 days within any 180 day period in the Schengen Area. |
| Russia | Visa not required | 90 days | 90 days within any 180 day period. |
| Rwanda | eVisa / Visa on arrival | 30 days | |
| Saint Kitts and Nevis | Electronic Travel Authorisation | 3 months | |
| Saint Lucia | Visa required | | |
| Saint Vincent and the Grenadines | Visa not required | 1 month | 3 months |
| Samoa | Visa not required | 60 days | |
| San Marino | Visa not required | | |
| São Tomé and Príncipe | eVisa | | |
| Saudi Arabia | Visa required | | |
| Senegal | Visa required | | |
| Serbia | Visa not required | 90 days | 90 days in a 180 days period counting from the date of first entry. |
| Seychelles | Electronic Border System | 3 months | Application can be submitted up to 30 days before travel.; Visitors must upload a reservation confirmation(s) for each visitor's location of stay in Seychelles.; Yellow fever vaccination certificate is required if coming from endemic countries.; Payment of the fee (EUR 10) by credit or debit card.; Valid for one journey only and it expires once exit the country. |
| Sierra Leone | eVisa | 3 months | |
| Singapore | Visa not required | 30 days | |
| Slovakia | Visa not required | 90 days | 90 days within any 180 day period in the Schengen Area. |
| Slovenia | Visa not required | 90 days | 90 days within any 180 day period in the Schengen Area. |
| Solomon Islands | Visa required | | Pre-arranged visa can be picked up on arrival. |
| Somalia | eVisa | 30 days | All visitors must have an approved Electronic Visa (eTAS) before the start of their journey. |
| South Africa | Visa not required | 90 days | Passports with so called extension Prórroga are considered as expired passports. Holders of such passports will not be allowed to entry the country. Such passport holders are subject to deportation and fine by local immigration authority. |
| South Sudan | eVisa | | Obtainable online.; Printed visa authorization must be presented at the time of travel. |
| Spain | Visa not required | 90 days | 90 days within any 180 day period in the Schengen Area. |
| Sri Lanka | eVisa / Visa on arrival | 60 days / 30 days | Sri Lanka introduced an ETA valid for 30 days. |
| Sudan | Visa required | | |
| Suriname | eVisa | 90 days | |
| Sweden | Visa not required | 90 days | 90 days within any 180 day period in the Schengen Area. |
| Switzerland | Visa not required | 90 days | 90 days within any 180 day period in the Schengen Area. |
| Syria | eVisa | | |
| Tajikistan | eVisa / Visa on arrival | 45 days | e-Visa holders can enter through all border points. |
| Tanzania | eVisa / Visa on arrival | 90 days | |
| Thailand | eVisa / Visa on arrival | 15 days | Health Certificate for Yellow Fever Vaccination required if travelling from Venezuela or country which require International Health Certificate for Yellow Fever Vaccination. |
| Timor-Leste | Visa on arrival | 30 days | Not available at all entry points. |
| Togo | eVisa | 15 days | |
| Tonga | Visa required | | |
| Trinidad and Tobago | eVisa | | Visa requirement effective on 17 June 2019. |
| Tunisia | Visa required | | |
| Turkey | Visa not required | 3 months | |
| Turkmenistan | Visa required | | |
| Tuvalu | Visa on arrival | 1 month | |
| Uganda | eVisa | 3 months | Determined at the port of entry. |
| Ukraine | Visa required | | |
| United Arab Emirates | Visa required | | A 96-hour transit visa can be obtained on arrival at Dubai (DXB), provided transit time is at least 8 hours; and holding onward ticket to a third country; and holding a passport valid for at least 6 months from date of arrival. Visa fee of 170 AED. Visas are only issued as a part of a transit package together with hotel accommodation and airport transfer.; May apply using 'Smart service'. |
| United Kingdom | Visa required | | |
| United States | Visa restricted | | Effective June 9, 2025, no new immigrant visas will be issued to nationals of the seven countries, and no B-1, B-2, B-1/B-2, F, M, or J nonimmigrant visas will be issued, with certain exemptions. |
| Uruguay | Visa not required | 3 months | |
| Uzbekistan | eVisa | 30 days | 5-day visa-free transit at the international airports if holding a confirmed onward ticket for a flight to a third country. |
| Vanuatu | eVisa | | |
| Vatican City | Visa not required | | |
| Vietnam | eVisa | | e-Visa is valid for 90 days and multiple entry.; Visa free for 30 days when visiting Phú Quốc |
| Yemen | Visa required | | |
| Zambia | eVisa / Visa on arrival | 90 days | |
| Zimbabwe | eVisa / Visa on arrival | 30 days | |

=== Dependent, Disputed, or Restricted territories ===
Visa requirements for Venezuelan citizens for visits to various territories, disputed areas, partially recognized countries not mentioned in the list above, and restricted zones:

| Territory | Visa requirement | Notes (excluding departure fees) |
|---|---|---|
| Abkhazia | Visa not required | 90 days |
| American Samoa | Visa required | |
| Anguilla | Visa required | |
| Aruba | Visa required | 90 days. If you hold a residence permit or multiple-entry visa for the Schengen Area, Overseas France, United Kingdom, Ireland, United States or Canada, you do not need a visa. |
| Bermuda | Visa required | Visa not required for holders of Canadian, US or UK multiple-entry visa valid for at least 45 days beyond the period of intended stay in Bermuda for a maximum stay of 3 months |
| British Indian Ocean Territory | Permission required | |
| British Virgin Islands | Visa not required | 30 days |
| Caribbean Netherlands | Visa required | 90 days. If you hold a residence permit or multiple-entry visa for the Schengen Area, Overseas France, United Kingdom, Ireland, United States or Canada, you do not need a visa. |
| Cayman Islands | Visa required | Visa requirement effective on 2 April 2026.; Visa not required for travelers holding a valid Canadian, UK or US residence permit and provided that they present upon arrival a return or round-trip ticket to the country that issued the residence permit. Holders of a Canadian residence permit may alternatively present a return or round-trip ticket to the United States. |
| Cook Islands | Visa not required | 31 days |
| Crimea | Visa not required | 90 days |
| Curacao | Visa required | 90 days. If you hold a residence permit or multiple-entry visa for the Schengen Area, Overseas France, United Kingdom, Ireland, United States or Canada, you do not need a visa. |
| Falkland Islands | Visa required | |
| Faroe Islands | Visa not required | 90 days. |
| French Guiana | Visa not required | 90 days. Visa granted for overseas territories (New Caledonia, French Polynesia, la Réunion, Guyane, Guadeloupe, Martinique, Mayotte, Saint-Barthélemy, Saint-Martin, Saint-Pierre-et-Miquelon, Wallis et Futuna, Terres australes et antarctiques françaises) does not entitle his holder to visit the Schengen area nor MONACO. A separate Schengen visa is necessary. |
| French Polynesia | Visa not required | 90 days. Visa granted for overseas territories (New Caledonia, French Polynesia, la Réunion, Guyane, Guadeloupe, Martinique, Mayotte, Saint-Barthélemy, Saint-Martin, Saint-Pierre-et-Miquelon, Wallis et Futuna, Terres australes et antarctiques françaises) does not entitle his holder to visit the Schengen area nor MONACO. A separate Schengen visa is necessary. |
| Gibraltar | Visa required | EU Residence permit holders issued due to family unification with EU citizen travelling with their spouses to Gibraltar for tourism purpose are visa exempt. EU Residence permit and document proving that it has been issued as reason of family unification with EU citizen including the name of EU citizen has to be presented at border crossing. Visa is still required if Residence permit holder is travelling without spouse and/or Residence permit has been issued for different reason than for Family Unification with EU citizen. |
| Greenland | Visa not required | 90 days |
| Guadeloupe | Visa not required | 90 days. Visa granted for overseas territories (New Caledonia, French Polynesia, la Réunion, Guyane, Guadeloupe, Martinique, Mayotte, Saint-Barthélemy, Saint-Martin, Saint-Pierre-et-Miquelon, Wallis et Futuna, Terres australes et antarctiques françaises) does not entitle his holder to visit the Schengen area nor MONACO. A separate Schengen visa is necessary. |
| Guam | Visa required | |
| Guernsey | Visa required | |
| (China) Hainan | Visa required | |
| Hong Kong | Visa not required | 3 months |
| Iraqi Kurdistan | Visa required | |
| Isle of Man | Visa required | |
| Jersey | Visa required | |
| Kosovo | Visa not required | 90 days |
| Macau | Visa on arrival | 30 days |
| Martinique | Visa not required | 90 days. Visa granted for overseas territories (New Caledonia, French Polynesia, la Réunion, Guyane, Guadeloupe, Martinique, Mayotte, Saint-Barthélemy, Saint-Martin, Saint-Pierre-et-Miquelon, Wallis et Futuna, Terres australes et antarctiques françaises) does not entitle his holder to visit the Schengen area nor MONACO. A separate Schengen visa is necessary. |
| Mayotte | Visa not required | 90 days. Visa granted for overseas territories (New Caledonia, French Polynesia, la Réunion, Guyane, Guadeloupe, Martinique, Mayotte, Saint-Barthélemy, Saint-Martin, Saint-Pierre-et-Miquelon, Wallis et Futuna, Terres australes et antarctiques françaises) does not entitle his holder to visit the Schengen area nor MONACO. A separate Schengen visa is necessary. |
| Montserrat | eVisa | e-Visa can be obtained online. |
| New Caledonia | Visa not required | 90 days. Visa granted for overseas territories (New Caledonia, French Polynesia, la Réunion, Guyane, Guadeloupe, Martinique, Mayotte, Saint-Barthélemy, Saint-Martin, Saint-Pierre-et-Miquelon, Wallis et Futuna, Terres australes et antarctiques françaises) does not entitle his holder to visit the Schengen area nor MONACO. A separate Schengen visa is necessary. |
| Niue | Visa on arrival | 30 days |
| Northern Mariana Islands | Visa is required | |
| Palestine | Visa required | |
| Pitcairn Islands | Visa not required | 14 days |
| Puerto Rico | Visa required | |
| Réunion | Visa not required | 90 days. Visa granted for overseas territories (New Caledonia, French Polynesia, la Réunion, Guyane, Guadeloupe, Martinique, Mayotte, Saint-Barthélemy, Saint-Martin, Saint-Pierre-et-Miquelon, Wallis et Futuna, Terres australes et antarctiques françaises) does not entitle his holder to visit the Schengen area nor MONACO. A separate Schengen visa is necessary. |
| Saint Barthélemy | Visa not required | 90 days. Visa granted for overseas territories (New Caledonia, French Polynesia, la Réunion, Guyane, Guadeloupe, Martinique, Mayotte, Saint-Barthélemy, Saint-Martin, Saint-Pierre-et-Miquelon, Wallis et Futuna, Terres australes et antarctiques françaises) does not entitle his holder to visit the Schengen area nor MONACO. A separate Schengen visa is necessary. |
| Saint Helena | eVisa | |
| Saint Pierre and Miquelon | Visa not required | 90 days. Visa granted for overseas territories (New Caledonia, French Polynesia, la Réunion, Guyane, Guadeloupe, Martinique, Mayotte, Saint-Barthélemy, Saint-Martin, Saint-Pierre-et-Miquelon, Wallis et Futuna, Terres australes et antarctiques françaises) does not entitle his holder to visit the Schengen area nor MONACO. A separate Schengen visa is necessary. |
| Saint-Martin | Visa not required | 90 days. Visa granted for overseas territories (New Caledonia, French Polynesia, la Réunion, Guyane, Guadeloupe, Martinique, Mayotte, Saint-Barthélemy, Saint-Martin, Saint-Pierre-et-Miquelon, Wallis et Futuna, Terres australes et antarctiques françaises) does not entitle holder to visit the Schengen area nor MONACO. A separate Schengen visa is necessary. |
| Sint Maarten | Visa required | 90 days. If you hold a residence permit or multiple-entry visa for the Schengen Area, Overseas France, United Kingdom, Ireland, United States or Canada, you do not need a visa. If you hold a residence permit or proof of return for Saint Martin (the French part of the island), you do not need a visa to enter St Maarten (the Dutch part of the island). If you are travelling overland to Saint Martin (the French part of the island) from St Maarten, you do not need a visa for the time you spend in the Dutch part. You must, however, provide proof of a confirmed hotel reservation. You must also hold a valid visa issued by the French authorities (if you are required to have one). If you hold a visa for Saint Martin only, you do not need a visa to enter St Maarten; however, you do need a visa for the other Caribbean parts of the Kingdom. |
| Taiwan | Visa required | |
| Turks and Caicos Islands | Visa not required | 90 days |
| US Virgin Islands | Visa required | |
| Wallis and Futuna | Visa not required | 90 days. Visa granted for overseas territories (New Caledonia, French Polynesia, la Réunion, Guyane, Guadeloupe, Martinique, Mayotte, Saint-Barthélemy, Saint-Martin, Saint-Pierre-et-Miquelon, Wallis et Futuna, Terres australes et antarctiques françaises) does not entitle his holder to visit the Schengen area nor MONACO. A separate Schengen visa is necessary. |

== Non-visa restrictions ==
=== Blank passport pages ===
Many countries require a minimum number of blank pages to be available in the passport being presented, typically one or two pages. Endorsement pages, which often appear after the visa pages, are not counted as being valid or available.

=== Vaccination ===
Cover of the new International Certificate of Vaccination issued by the Bureau of Quarantine in the Philippines since 2021

The African countries of Angola, Benin, Burkina Faso, Burundi, Cameroon, Central African Republic, Democratic Republic of the Congo, Republic of the Congo, Côte d'Ivoire, Gabon, Ghana, Guinea-Bissau, Mali, Niger, Sierra Leone and Togo, South Sudan and Uganda, along with French Guiana in South America, require all incoming passengers older than nine months to one year, to have a current International Certificate of Vaccination or Prophylaxis.

Some other countries require vaccination only if the passenger is coming from an infected area or has visited one recently or has transited for 12 hours in those countries: Algeria, Botswana, Cabo Verde, Chad, Djibouti, Egypt, Eswatini, Ethiopia, Gambia, Ghana, Guinea, Lesotho, Libya, Equatorial Guinea, Eritrea, Madagascar, Malawi, Mauritania, Mauritius, Mozambique, Namibia, Nigeria, Papua New Guinea, Seychelles, Somalia, South Africa, Sudan, Tunisia, Uganda, Tanzania, Zambia and Zimbabwe.

=== Passport validity length ===
Very few countries, such as Paraguay, just require a valid passport on arrival.

However many countries and groupings now require only an identity card – especially from their neighbours. Other countries may have special bilateral arrangements that depart from the generality of their passport validity length policies to shorten the period of passport validity required for each other's citizens or even accept passports that have already expired (but not been cancelled).

Some countries, such as Japan, Ireland and the United Kingdom, require a passport valid throughout the period of the intended stay.

In the absence of specific bilateral agreements, countries requiring passports to be valid for at least 6 more months on arrival include Afghanistan, Algeria, Anguilla, Bahrain, Bhutan, Botswana, British Virgin Islands, Brunei, Cambodia, Cameroon, Cape Verde, Cayman Islands, Central African Republic, Chad, Comoros, Costa Rica, Côte d'Ivoire, Curaçao, Ecuador, Egypt, El Salvador, Equatorial Guinea, Fiji, Gabon, Guinea Bissau, Guyana, Haiti, India, Indonesia, Iran, Iraq, Israel, Jordan, Kenya, Kiribati, Kuwait, Laos, Madagascar, Malaysia, Marshall Islands, Mongolia, Myanmar, Namibia, Nepal, Nicaragua, Nigeria, Oman, Palau, Papua New Guinea, Peru, Philippines, Qatar, Rwanda, Samoa, Saudi Arabia, Singapore, Solomon Islands, Somalia, Sri Lanka, Sudan, Suriname, Tanzania, Thailand, Timor-Leste, Tokelau, Tonga, Turkey, Tuvalu, Uganda, United Arab Emirates, Vanuatu, Venezuela, and Vietnam.

Countries requiring passports valid for at least 4 months on arrival include Micronesia and Zambia.

Countries requiring passports with a validity of at least 3 months beyond the date of intended departure include Azerbaijan, Bosnia and Herzegovina, Honduras, Montenegro, Nauru, Moldova and New Zealand. Similarly, the EEA countries of Iceland, Liechtenstein, Norway, all European Union countries (except Ireland) together with Switzerland also require 3 months validity beyond the date of the bearer's intended departure unless the bearer is an EEA or Swiss national.

Countries requiring passports valid for at least 3 months on arrival include Albania, North Macedonia, Panama, and Senegal.

Bermuda requires passports to be valid for at least 45 days upon entry.

Countries that require a passport validity of at least one month beyond the date of intended departure include Eritrea, Hong Kong, Lebanon, Macau, the Maldives and South Africa.

==== Maximum passport age ====
Countries of the Schengen area require non-EU passports to be less than 10 years old upon entry.

=== Criminal record ===
Some countries, including Australia, Canada, Fiji, New Zealand and the United States, routinely deny entry to non-citizens who have a criminal record, while others impose restrictions depending on the type of conviction and the length of the sentence.

=== Persona non grata ===
The government of a country can declare a diplomat persona non grata, banning them from entering the country or expelling them if they have already entered. In non-diplomatic use, the authorities of a country may also declare a foreigner persona non grata permanently or temporarily, usually because of unlawful activity.

=== Israeli stamps ===
Kuwait, Lebanon, Libya, and Yemen do not allow entry to people with passport stamps from Israel or whose passports have either a used or an unused Israeli visa, or where there is evidence of previous travel to Israel such as entry or exit stamps from neighbouring border posts in transit countries such as Jordan and Egypt.

To circumvent this Arab League boycott of Israel, the Israeli immigration services have now mostly ceased to stamp foreign nationals' passports on either entry to or exit from Israel (unless the entry is for some work-related purposes). Since 15 January 2013, Israel no longer stamps foreign passports at Ben Gurion Airport. Passports are still (as of 22 June 2017) stamped at Erez when passing into and out of Gaza.

Iran refuses admission to holders of passports containing an Israeli visa or stamp that is less than 12 months old.

=== Biometrics ===
Several countries mandate that all travellers, or all foreign travellers, be fingerprinted on arrival and will refuse admission to or even arrest travellers who refuse to comply. In some countries, such as the United States, this may apply even to transit passengers who merely wish to change planes rather than go landside.

Fingerprinting countries/regions include Afghanistan, Argentina, Brunei, Cambodia, China, Ethiopia, Ghana, Guinea, India, Japan, Kenya (both fingerprints and a photo are taken), Malaysia upon entry and departure, Mongolia, Saudi Arabia, the Schengen Area, Singapore, South Korea, Taiwan, Thailand, Uganda, the United Arab Emirates and the United States.

Many countries also require a photo be taken of people entering the country. The United States, which does not fully implement exit control formalities at its land frontiers (although long mandated by its own legislation), intends to implement facial recognition for passengers departing from international airports to identify people who overstay their visa.

Together with fingerprint and face recognition, iris scanning is one of three biometric identification technologies internationally standardised since 2006 by the International Civil Aviation Organization (ICAO) for use in e-passports and the United Arab Emirates conducts iris scanning on visitors who need to apply for a visa. The United States Department of Homeland Security has announced plans to greatly increase the biometric data it collects at US borders. In 2018, Singapore began trials of iris scanning at three land and maritime immigration checkpoints.

== See also ==
- Visa policy of Venezuela
- Venezuelan passport
- Venezuelan nationality law

== Notes ==
This article incorporates text available under the CC0 license.
