= Visa policies of Overseas France =

Policies on permits required to enter any part of Overseas France

Although the European portion of France is part of the Schengen Area, its overseas departments, collectivities and other territories apply their own visa policies, which have some additional exemptions or restrictions compared to the visa policy of the Schengen Area.

== Visa exemptions ==
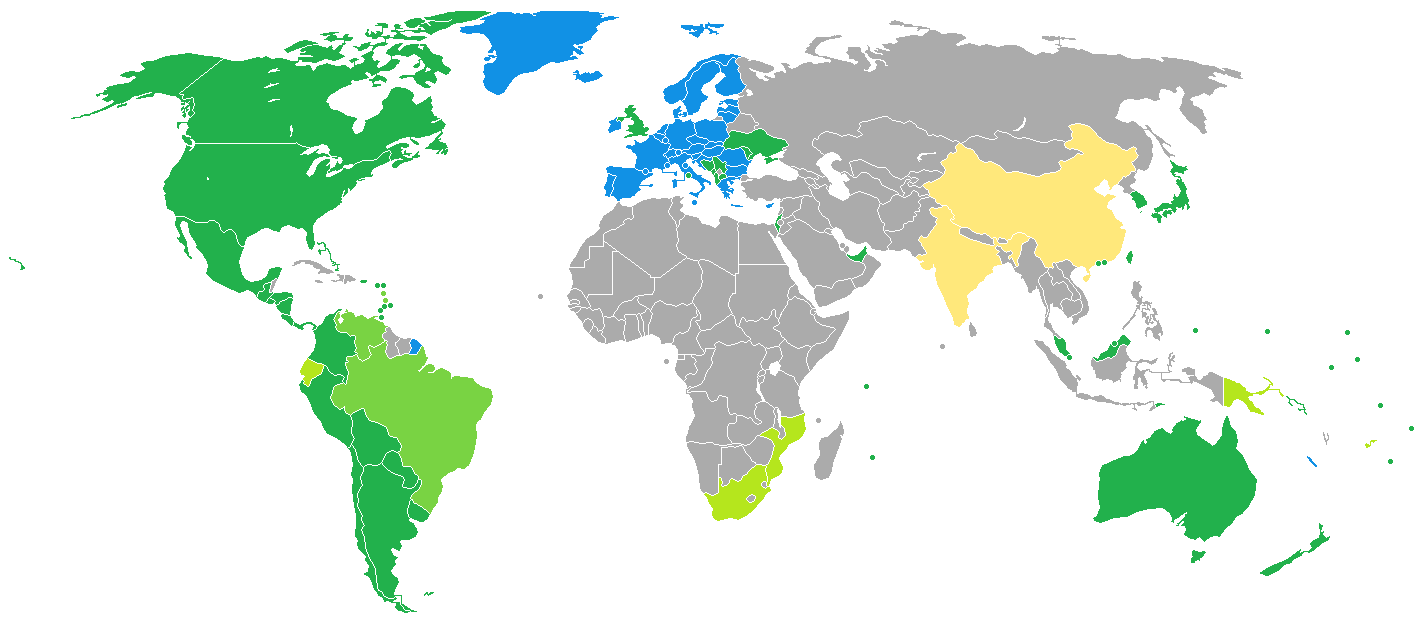
Visa exemptions for the French overseas departments and regions, overseas collectivities, and New Caledonia: All territories, unlimited period or up to 90 days All territories, up to 90 days All territories, up to 90, 30 or 15 days, or most territories, up to 90 days Some territories, up to 90 days Some territories, up to 15 days on organized trips

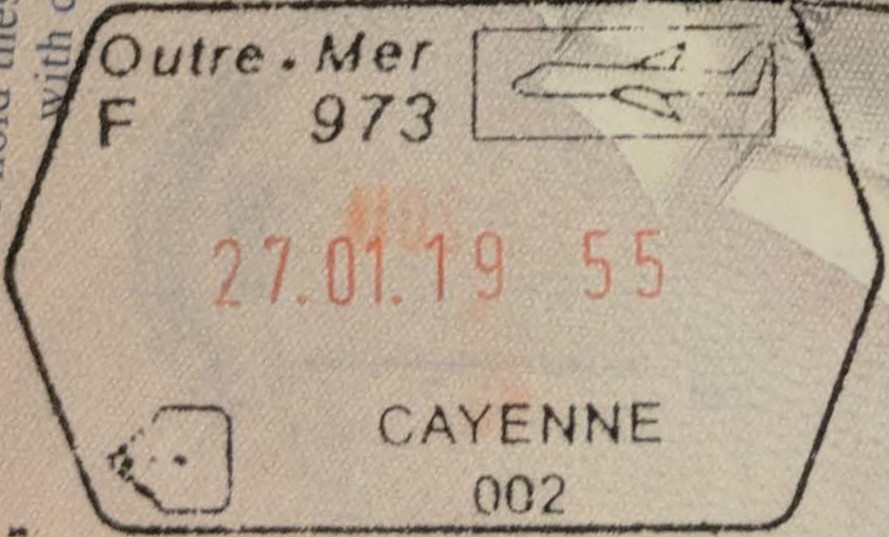
French Guiana exit stamp

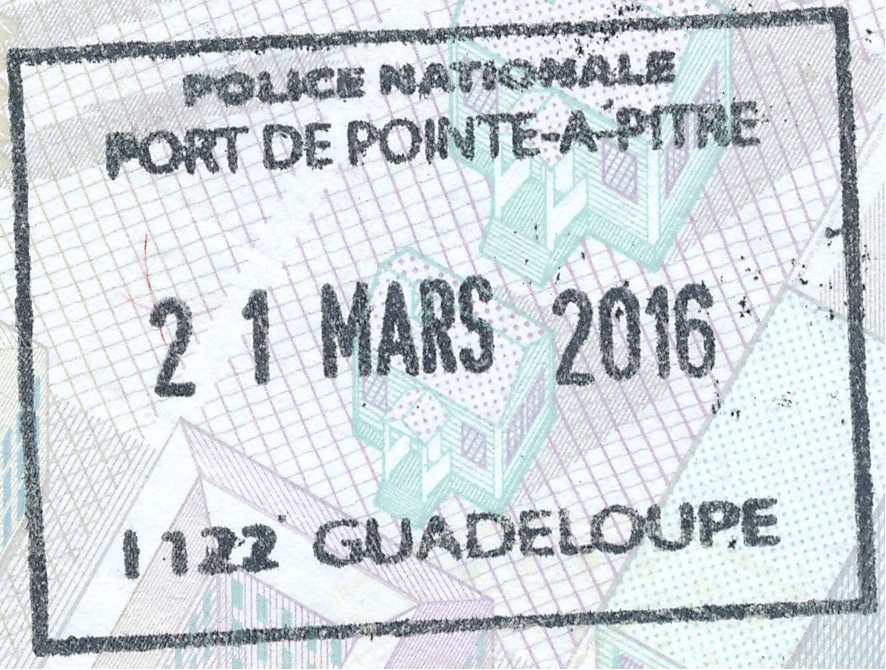
Guadeloupe entry stamp

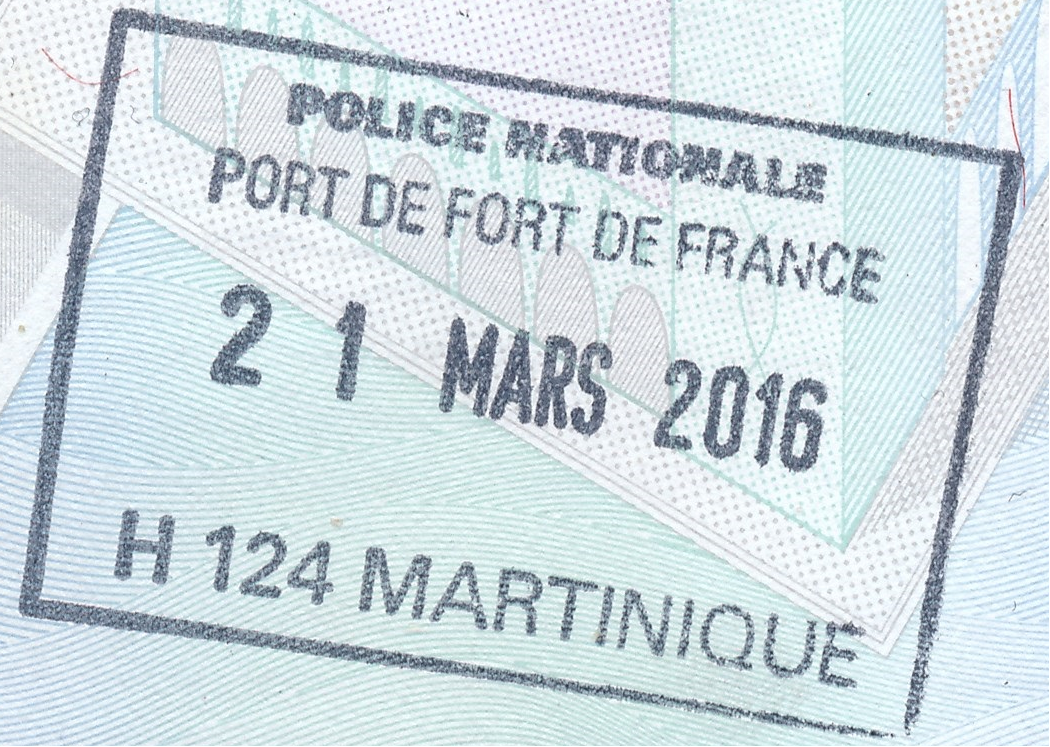
Martinique entry stamp

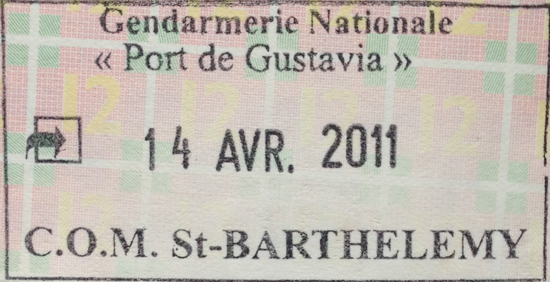
Saint Barthélemy entry stamp

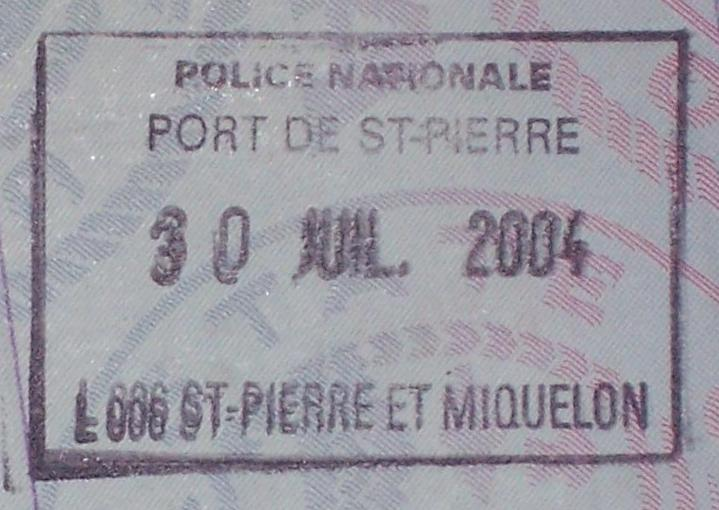
Saint Pierre and Miquelon entry stamp

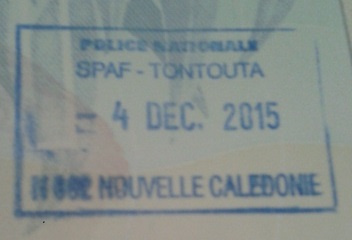
New Caledonia entry stamp

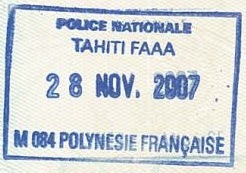
French Polynesia entry stamp

Overseas France consists of:

- Overseas departments and regions: French Guiana, Guadeloupe, Martinique, Mayotte, Réunion
- Overseas collectivities: French Polynesia, Saint Barthélemy, Saint Martin, Saint Pierre and Miquelon, Wallis and Futuna
- New Caledonia, a collectivity with special status
- French Southern and Antarctic Lands, an overseas territory with no permanent population
- Clipperton Island, an uninhabited atoll directly administered by the French government

Visa exemptions exist for the overseas departments and regions, overseas collectivities, and New Caledonia. Visits to the French Southern and Antarctic Lands and to Clipperton Island require specific authorizations.

=== Unlimited period ===
Nationals of the following countries can enter and reside for an unlimited period without a visa in all French overseas departments and regions, overseas collectivities, and New Caledonia, except as otherwise noted:

- European Union member states (Note: The EU treaties only apply to the French overseas departments and regions and Saint Martin, but the French code of entry and residence of foreigners extends the right of nationals of EU member states to reside also in the other overseas collectivities and New Caledonia.)
- European Free Trade Association member states (Note: The agreements with EFTA member states only apply to the French overseas departments and regions and Saint Martin, but the French code of entry and residence of foreigners extends the right of nationals of EFTA member states to reside also in Saint Barthélemy and Saint Pierre and Miquelon. For New Caledonia, Wallis and Futuna, and French Polynesia, neither the code nor the ministerial orders explicitly mention visa exemptions for nationals of EFTA member states, but in practice the French government does not require visas from them for stays of up to 3 months in a 6-month period there.)
- Andorra (Note: The convention allowing nationals of Andorra to reside in France under the same conditions as nationals of other EU member states specifies that it applies to the departments of France, and it is unclear whether the French government extends it to the overseas collectivities and New Caledonia. The French government website on visas states that nationals of Andorra may reside for an unlimited period without a visa in all French territories except the French Southern and Antarctic Lands, but the ministerial orders specify visa exemptions for nationals of Andorra only for stays of up to 90 days in a 180-day period or 3 months in a 6-month period.)
- Monaco (Note: The convention allowing nationals of Monaco to reside freely in France does not specify a territorial restriction. The ministerial orders specify visa exemptions for nationals of Monaco for an unlimited period in all overseas departments and regions, overseas collectivities, and New Caledonia.)
- San Marino (Note: The convention allowing nationals of San Marino to reside freely in France specifies that it only applies to metropolitan France, but the ministerial orders specify visa exemptions for nationals of San Marino for an unlimited period in all overseas departments and regions, overseas collectivities, and New Caledonia.)

Nationals of EU and EFTA member states may use their national identity card instead of their passport as a travel document to enter any French territory. (Note: If not traveling directly from a European country or another French territory, a passport may be necessary to leave or transit other countries.) They may also work freely in the parts of Overseas France that are part of the European Union (overseas departments and regions, and Saint Martin), as well as Saint Barthélemy, but those who are not nationals of France need a permit to work in Saint Pierre and Miquelon, New Caledonia, Wallis and Futuna, and French Polynesia.

=== Short stays ===
For stays of up to 90 days in a 180-day period in all overseas departments and regions, Saint Barthélemy, Saint Martin, and Saint Pierre and Miquelon, and up to 3 months in a 6-month period in New Caledonia, Wallis and Futuna, and French Polynesia, visa-free entry is granted to nationals of the following countries and territories, except as otherwise noted:

- Albania
- Antigua and Barbuda
- Argentina
- Australia
- Bahamas
- Barbados
- Bolivia
- Bosnia and Herzegovina
- Brazil (Note: For French Guiana, visa exemption for stays of up to 30 days in a 180-day period, until 31 January 2027; up to 15 days for trips organized by an approved travel agency; up to 3 days when in transit to France (including all territories) or to Brazil; residents of Oiapoque holding a cross-border card, only for visits to Saint-Georges for up to 72 hours; or members of emergency services.)
- Brunei
- Canada
- Chile
- Colombia
- Costa Rica
- Dominica (Note: For French Guiana, Guadeloupe, Martinique, Saint Barthélemy, and Saint Martin, visa-free up to 15 days per stay, as long as the stays do not total more than 120 days in a 12-month period.)
- East Timor
- El Salvador
- Grenada
- Guatemala
- Honduras
- Hong Kong
- Israel
- Japan
- Kiribati
- Macao
- Malaysia
- Marshall Islands
- Mauritius
- Mexico
- Micronesia
- Moldova
- Montenegro
- Nauru
- New Zealand
- Nicaragua
- North Macedonia
- Palau
- Panama
- Paraguay
- Peru
- Saint Kitts and Nevis
- Saint Lucia
- Saint Vincent and the Grenadines
- Samoa
- Serbia (Note: Except with passport issued by the Coordination Directorate for Kosovo and Metohija.)
- Seychelles
- Singapore
- Solomon Islands
- South Korea
- Taiwan (Note: With passport bearing identity card number.)
- Tonga
- Trinidad and Tobago
- Tuvalu
- Ukraine (Note: With biometric passport.)
- United Arab Emirates
- United Kingdom (Note: Including all classes of British nationality.)
- United States
- Uruguay
- Vatican City
- Venezuela (Note: Except for Saint Barthélemy and Saint Martin.)

This exemption also applies to:

- Holders of a long-stay visa or residence permit issued by France or another Schengen Area country
- Nationals of the following countries holding a multiple-entry visa issued by France with validity between 6 months and 5 years:

- Bahrain
- China
- India
- Indonesia
- Kuwait
- Oman
- Qatar
- Saudi Arabia
- South Africa
- Thailand

Nationals of these countries traveling by cruise ship are also granted a visa exemption for a stay of up to 24 hours.

The following categories of travelers may also transit without a visa:

- Passengers transiting only the international transit area of an airport, except the same categories required to have an airport transit visa for the European part of France
- Airline and ship crew members
- Cruise ship passengers holding a visa for any French territory or a residence permit for Andorra, Canada, Japan, Monaco, San Marino or the United States, for a stay of up to 24 hours
- Cruise ship passengers not leaving the ship

=== Additional exemptions for specific territories ===
For specific territories, nationals of the following countries are also granted visa-free stays of up to 90 days in a 180-day period, except as otherwise noted.

For French Guiana, Guadeloupe and Martinique:

- Ecuador

Travelers coming directly from Sint Maarten may enter Saint Martin through their open border.

For Saint Pierre and Miquelon:

- Holders of a Canadian identification document (e.g. a driver's licence or student card), of any nationality, traveling directly from Canada; passport not required either

For Mayotte:

- Mozambique

For Réunion:

- China (Note: Visa-free entry of up to 15 days for each stay, for trips organized by an approved travel agency.)
- India
- Mozambique
- South Africa

Nationals of China, India and Russia traveling from Mauritius or Seychelles to Réunion may obtain a free visa on arrival for a stay of up to 15 days.

For New Caledonia, Wallis and Futuna, and French Polynesia:

- China (Note: Only for New Caledonia and French Polynesia.)
- Fiji (Note: For stays of up to 3 months in a 6-month period.)
- Papua New Guinea

=== Summary of visa exemptions ===
Country	Metropolitan France (Schengen)	French Guiana, Guadeloupe and Martinique	Saint Martin and Saint Barthélemy	Saint Pierre and Miquelon	Mayotte	Réunion	New Caledonia and French Polynesia	Wallis and Futuna
France	Yes	Yes	Yes	Yes	Yes	Yes	Yes	Yes
EU (except France) and EFTA	Yes	Yes	Yes	Yes	Yes	Yes	Yes	Yes
Schengen 'Annex II' (Note: Except Georgia, Kosovo and Venezuela.)	Yes	Yes	Yes	Yes	Yes	Yes	Yes	Yes
Venezuela	Yes	Yes	No	Yes	Yes	Yes	Yes	Yes
Georgia	Yes	No	No	No	No	No	No	No
Kosovo	Yes	No	No	No	No	No	No	No
Bolivia	No	Yes	Yes	Yes	Yes	Yes	Yes	Yes
Nauru	No	Yes	Yes	Yes	Yes	Yes	Yes	Yes
Ecuador	No	Yes	No	No	No	No	No	No
Mozambique	No	No	No	No	Yes	Yes	No	No
South Africa	No	No	No	No	No	Yes	No	No
Fiji	No	No	No	No	No	No	Yes	Yes
Papua New Guinea	No	No	No	No	No	No	Yes	Yes
China	No	No	No	No	No	organized trips	organized trips	No
India	No	No	No	No	No	organized trips	No	No

== Obtaining a visa ==
Foreign nationals who need a visa for a part of Overseas France can obtain one by lodging an application at a French embassy or consulate in their country of residence (or, in the case of foreign nationals already in a part of France, the local prefecture) for a fee of up to €99 (depending on the destination, length of stay, age and nationality).

Visa fees
Length of stay	Destination	Regular fee	Reduced fee	No fee
Up to 90 days	France (Schengen)	€90	€45 for children ages 6 to 12; €35 for nationals of Armenia, Azerbaijan and Belarus	children under age 6, spouse of a French national, family members of other EU/EFTA nationals
Up to 90 days	French Guiana, Guadeloupe, Martinique, Saint Barthélemy, Saint Martin, Réunion	€60	€35 for children ages 6 to 12	children under age 6, spouse of a French national, family members of other EU/EFTA nationals
Up to 90 days	Saint Pierre and Miquelon, Mayotte, New Caledonia, Wallis and Futuna, French Polynesia, French Southern and Antarctic Lands	€9		spouse of a French national, family members of other EU/EFTA nationals
More than 90 days	any	€99	€50 for students; €15 for children adopted by a French national	spouse of a French national

Schengen short-stay visas are not valid for Overseas France (except for nationals of certain countries as listed above), and vice versa. A visa with the designation "départements français d'Amérique" (DFA) allows visiting all parts of Overseas France in the Americas (French Guiana, Guadeloupe, Martinique, Saint Barthélemy, Saint Martin, and Saint Pierre and Miquelon). A visa with the designation "valable pour France sauf CTOM" allows visiting all parts of Overseas France in the Americas as well as Réunion.

== Visitor statistics ==
Visitor statistics of French Polynesia
Country/territory	2016	2015	2014	2013
United States	67,908	63,913	62,278	53,656
France	39,086	35,765	34,887	32,946
Japan	12,174	11,447	12,527	13,175
Australia	9,757	9,167	9,315	9,167
Italy	7,888	7,993	7,887	8,103
New Zealand	7,221	7,315	7,136	6,477
Canada	6,326	8,402	9,279	7,206
China	5,987	5,555	3,268	1,876
New Caledonia	4,206	4,185	4,111	3,826
United Kingdom	3,980	4,711	4,834	3,255
Germany	3,951	3,538	4,028	3,477
Total	192,495	183,831	180,602	164,393

Visitor statistics of New Caledonia
Country/territory	2016	2015	2014	2013
Metropolitan France	36,725	37,245	36,545	39,183
Australia	22,809	20,926	18,065	15,722
Japan	21,151	20,056	19,087	15,674
New Zealand	9,143	8,529	6,780	6,334
Wallis and Futuna	6,128	6,329	6,128	6,763
Vanuatu	3,648	3,520	3,616	3,950
French Polynesia	3,453	3,552	3,371	3,946
Italy	1,045	1,104	832	718
Total	115,676	113,951	107,187	107,753

== See also ==
- Visa policy of the Schengen Area
- Visa policy of the Kingdom of the Netherlands in the Caribbean
