= Visa policy of Svalbard =

Policy on permits required to enter Svalbard

Uniquely, the Norwegian archipelago of Svalbard, located in the High Arctic, is an entirely visa-free zone. However, travellers who require a visa to enter mainland Norway (part of the Schengen area) must have a Schengen visa if they travel via mainland Norway. This must be a double-entry visa so they can return to mainland Norway.

Those traveling to and from Svalbard must bring passports or national identity cards, as all are subject to identity checks. Passports or national identity cards satisfy the Schengen regulatory requirements for identity verification. Due to a transitional arrangement, Norwegian citizens were formerly also able to prove their identity with a document issued in Norway which included at least a name, photo and date of birth, such as a Norwegian driving licence issued after 1998; the transitional period ended on 31 August 2022.

Everyone may live and work in Svalbard indefinitely regardless of country of citizenship. The Svalbard Treaty grants treaty nationals right of abode equal to that of Norwegian nationals. Non-treaty nationals may live and work indefinitely visa-free as well. Per Sefland, when he was Governor of Svalbard, said "It has been a chosen policy so far that we haven't made any difference between the treaty citizens and those from outside the treaty." "Regulations concerning rejection and expulsion from Svalbard" are enforced on a non-discriminatory basis. Grounds for exclusion include lack of means of support and violation of laws or regulations.

Hans-Henrik Hartmann, when he was head of the legal unit at the Norwegian government's immigration department, said "If an asylum seeker is refused residence in Norway he can settle in Svalbard so long as he can get there and is able to pay for himself." Svalbard has a high cost of living but only a limited welfare system. Welfare and health care is available only for Norwegians and for workers employed by a Norwegian company.

The Norwegian Nationality Act applies to Svalbard (mentioned in Section 1). However, the Act does not provide any special rules for foreign nationals residing on Svalbard. Foreigners living on Svalbard must meet the conditions of the law to obtain Norwegian citizenship. In order to acquire Norwegian citizenship upon application, there is, according to the main rule, a requirement to fulfill the conditions for a permanent residence permit and, consequently, a requirement for residence in mainland Norway with a residence permit. Such permits are granted in accordance with the Norwegian Immigration Act. Because the Norwegian Immigration Act does not apply to Svalbard (specified in Section 6), residence on Svalbard does not qualify foreign nationals for residence permits in mainland Norway.

== See also ==
- Visa policy of the Schengen Area
- Free migration
- Open border
