= Visa policy of the Schengen Area =

Policy on permits required to enter the Schengen Area

The visa policy of the Schengen Area is a component within the wider area of freedom, security and justice policy of the European Union. It applies to the Schengen Area and Cyprus, but not to EU member state Ireland. The visa policy allows nationals of certain countries to enter the Schengen Area via air, land or sea without a visa for up to 90 days within any 180-day period. Nationals of certain other countries are required to have a visa to enter and, in some cases, transit through the Schengen area.

The Schengen Area consists of 25 EU member states and four non-EU countries that are members of EFTA: Iceland, Liechtenstein, Norway and Switzerland. It also applies de facto to the four European microstates of Andorra, Monaco, San Marino, and Vatican City, as well as to the British overseas territory of Gibraltar, which have open borders with Schengen countries.

Cyprus, while an EU member state, is not yet part of the Schengen Area but, nonetheless, has a visa policy that is partially based on the Schengen acquis.

Ireland has opted out of the Schengen Agreement and instead operates its own visa policy, as do certain overseas territories of Schengen member states.

Nationals of EU single market countries are not only visa-exempt but are legally entitled to enter and reside in each other's countries. However, their right to freedom of movement in each other's countries can be limited in a reserved number of situations, as prescribed by EU treaties.

== Visa policy map ==
Visa policy of the Schengen Area The Schengen Area Other EU members and territories of Schengen countries outside the Schengen Area with freedom of movement in the Schengen Area Visa not required for short stays in the Schengen Area, usually 90 days within any 180-day period (EU 2018/1806 Annex II) Visa required to enter the Schengen Area, and, in some cases, to transit through certain Schengen countries (EU 2018/1806 Annex I) Visa required to enter or transit through any Schengen country (EC 810/2009 Annex IV)

== Visa exemptions ==
=== Freedom of movement ===
A clickable Euler diagram showing the relationships between various European regional organisations

- European Union citizens
- Citizens of EFTA member states

Rules for freedom of movement
Directive 2004/38/EC defines the right of free movement for citizens of the European Economic Area (EEA), which includes the European Union (EU) and three European Free Trade Association (EFTA) members Iceland, Norway and Liechtenstein. Switzerland, which is a member of EFTA but not of the EEA, is not bound by the Directive but rather has a separate multilateral agreement on the free movement with the EU and its member states. Freedom of movement between Switzerland and the other EFTA countries happens in accordance with the EFTA convention. All of these countries comprise the EU single market. Andorra and San Marino citizens, upon accession to the Single Market, will hold the same work and travel freedom rights as the European Union citizens as outlined in the Association Agreement.

Nationals of all EU single market states holding a valid passport, passport card, or national identity card can enter, reside and work in each other's territory without a visa. If they are unable to present a valid passport or national identity card at the border, they must nonetheless be afforded every reasonable opportunity to obtain the necessary documents or have them brought to them within a reasonable period of time or corroborate or prove by other means that they are covered by the right of free movement.

However, EU single market states can refuse entry to any EU single market national on public policy, public security or public health grounds where the person presents a "genuine, present and sufficiently serious threat affecting one of the fundamental interests of society". If the person has obtained permanent residence in the country where entry is sought (a status which is normally attained after 5 years of residence), the member state can only expel the person on serious grounds of public policy or public security. Where the person has resided for 10 years or is a minor, the member state can only expel the person on imperative grounds of public security (and, in the case of minors, if expulsion is necessary in the best interests of the child, as provided for in the Convention on the Rights of the Child). Expulsion on public health grounds must relate to diseases with 'epidemic potential' which have occurred less than 3 months from the person's date of arrival in the member state where entry is sought.

=== Nationals of 'Annex II' countries and territories (visa waiver countries) ===
Since 2001, the European Union has issued a list of countries whose nationals need visas (Annex I) and a list of those who do not (Annex II). The two lists are also adopted by Cyprus, despite not being part of the Schengen Area yet.

Nationals of the following countries and territories holding ordinary passports may enter the Schengen Area and Cyprus without a visa, for short stays (90 days within any 180-day period):

Europe

- Albania
- Andorra
- Bosnia and Herzegovina
- Georgia
- Kosovo
- Moldova
- Montenegro
- Monaco
- North Macedonia
- San Marino
- Serbia
- Ukraine (Note: For holders of biometric passports only.)
- United Kingdom (Note: Including all classes of British nationality.)
- Vatican City

South America

- Argentina
- Brazil
- Chile
- Colombia
- Paraguay
- Peru
- Uruguay
- Venezuela

North America

- Antigua and Barbuda
- Bahamas
- Barbados
- Canada
- Costa Rica
- Dominica
- El Salvador
- Grenada
- Guatemala
- Honduras
- Mexico
- Nicaragua
- Panama
- Saint Kitts and Nevis
- Saint Lucia
- Saint Vincent and the Grenadines
- Trinidad and Tobago
- United States

Africa

- Mauritius
- Seychelles

Asia

- Brunei
- Hong Kong (Note: For holders of a Hong Kong Special Administrative Region passport.)
- Israel
- Japan
- Macau (Note: For holders of a Macao Special Administrative Region passport.)
- Malaysia
- Singapore
- South Korea
- Taiwan (Note: For holders of passports containing an identity card number.)
- Timor-Leste
- United Arab Emirates

Oceania

- Australia
- Kiribati
- Marshall Islands
- Micronesia
- New Zealand
- Palau
- Samoa
- Solomon Islands
- Tonga
- Tuvalu

Date of visa changes

Nationalities exempt from visas in all EU member states at the time, for holders of ordinary passports for short stays not including study or work (additional nationalities were exempt for only some EU member states):

- Before 1 July 1996: Austria, Belgium, Denmark, Finland, France, Germany, Greece, Ireland, Italy, Luxembourg, Netherlands, Portugal, Spain, Sweden, United Kingdom; (Note: British citizens, British subjects with right of abode in the United Kingdom, and British Overseas Territories citizens of Gibraltar.) Andorra, Argentina, Canada, Chile, Cyprus, Czech Republic, Hungary, Iceland, Israel, Japan, Liechtenstein, Malta, Monaco, New Zealand, Norway, Poland, San Marino, Slovakia, Slovenia, South Korea, Switzerland, United States, Uruguay, Vatican City
- 1 July 1996 to 15 April 1997: Brazil, Mexico; removed Vatican City
- 5 February 1998 to 1 May 1999: Australia, Paraguay, Singapore; removed Slovakia
- 1 May 1999 to 1 August 2000: Costa Rica, Estonia, Latvia, Lithuania; removed Australia

Nationalities exempt from visas in all EU member states at the time, except Ireland and the United Kingdom, and in non-EU states part of the Schengen Area (exemptions were harmonised):

- 1 August 2000 to 10 April 2001: Australia (resumed), Bolivia, Brunei, Bulgaria, Croatia, Ecuador, El Salvador, Guatemala, Honduras, Hong Kong, Macau, Malaysia, Nicaragua, Panama, Slovakia (resumed), Vatican City (resumed), Venezuela
- 1 January 2002: Romania
- 1 June 2003: removed Ecuador
- 19 January 2007: British Nationals (Overseas)
- 1 April 2007: removed Bolivia
- 28 May 2009: Antigua and Barbuda, Bahamas, Barbados, Mauritius, Saint Kitts and Nevis, Seychelles
- 19 December 2009: Republic of Macedonia (now North Macedonia), Montenegro, Serbia (Note: Except for holders of passports issued by the Coordination Directorate for Kosovo and Metohija.)
- 15 December 2010: Albania, Bosnia and Herzegovina
- 11 January 2011: Taiwan
- 28 April 2014: Moldova
- 9 June 2014: all other British nationals (Note: British subjects without right of abode in the United Kingdom, British Overseas Territories citizens other than of Gibraltar, British Overseas citizens, and British protected persons.)
- 6 May 2015: United Arab Emirates
- 26 May 2015: Timor-Leste
- 28 May 2015: Dominica, Grenada, Samoa, Saint Lucia, Saint Vincent and the Grenadines, Trinidad and Tobago, Vanuatu
- 21 November 2015: Tonga
- 3 December 2015: Colombia
- 8 December 2015: Palau
- 15 March 2016: Peru
- 24 June 2016: Kiribati
- 28 June 2016: Marshall Islands
- 2 July 2016: Tuvalu
- 20 September 2016: Micronesia
- 8 October 2016: Solomon Islands
- 28 March 2017: Georgia
- 11 June 2017: Ukraine
- 4 May 2022: removed Vanuatu (Note: The visa waiver agreement with Vanuatu was suspended from 4 May 2022 for holders of ordinary passports issued from 25 May 2015. Although the visa waiver could still apply to passports issued before that date, such passports had a validity of five years so they had already expired. The suspension was extended to all passports from 4 February 2023, was renewed on 4 August 2024, and became permanent from 3 February 2025.)
- 1 January 2024: Kosovo
- 13 October 2024: holders of Serbian passports issued by the Coordination Directorate for Kosovo and Metohija

Rules for Annex II nationals
To be able to enter the Schengen Area or Cyprus, the above Annex II nationals are required to:
- have a travel document which is valid for at least 3 months after the intended date of departure and which has been issued in the previous 10 years;
- have sufficient funds for their stay and onward/return journey;
- justify the purpose and conditions of their stay;
- not be listed in the Schengen Information System as someone to be refused entry and not be considered as a threat to public policy, internal security, public health or the international relations of any Schengen country.

The above Annex II nationals can enter the Schengen Area as a whole for pleasure or for business without the need to apply for a visa for a maximum of 90 days in any 180-day period (which entails considering the 180-day period preceding each day of stay). Any time spent by an Annex II national in the Schengen Area on a long-stay visa or a residence permit does not count towards the visa exemption period limit of 90 days.

Time spent in Gibraltar also counts as time spent in the Schengen Area for the purpose of visa-free stays.

All Annex II nationals can also enter Cyprus without a visa for a maximum of 90 days in a 180-day period. The visa-free time restriction for entering and staying in Cyprus is calculated separately from the one for the Schengen Area.

According to a table compiled by the European Commission, some Schengen countries permit certain nationals to work during their visa-free stay:

- Austria, Bulgaria, Czech Republic, Denmark, Estonia, Finland, Germany, Iceland, Italy, Latvia, Portugal, Romania: none
- Belgium, Croatia, Cyprus, Hungary, Liechtenstein, Lithuania, Luxembourg, Malta, Netherlands, Norway, Poland, Slovakia, Slovenia, Sweden: all visa-free nationals
- France: all visa-free nationals, except of Australia, Brazil, Japan, Mexico, Singapore, South Korea, United States and Venezuela
- Greece: all visa-free nationals not working as intellectual creators
- Spain: nationals of Andorra not working in an independent profession
- Switzerland: nationals of Andorra, Australia, Brunei, Japan, Malaysia, Monaco, New Zealand, San Marino, Singapore, United Kingdom and Vatican City

=== Residents and holders of visas of Schengen states ===
Holders of a long-stay visa or residence permit issued by a Schengen state, Gibraltar, or Monaco may also travel to other Schengen states, without an additional visa, for a stay of up to 90 days in any 180-day period. Short-stay visas issued by a Schengen state are also valid for all other Schengen states unless marked otherwise.

Holders of a double or multiple-entry visa or residence permit issued by a Schengen state, Gibraltar, or Monaco may also travel to Cyprus without an additional visa, for a stay of up to 90 days in any 180-day period, except nationals of Turkey and Azerbaijan, who still need a Cypriot visa. However, visas and residence permits issued by Cyprus are not valid for travel to the Schengen Area.

=== Family members of EU single market nationals ===
Individuals of any nationality who are family members of EU single market nationals and are in possession of a residence card indicating their status are exempt from the requirement to hold a visa when entering the EU single market when they are accompanying their EU single market family member or are seeking to join them.

Rules for family members of EU single market nationals
An individual can enter and stay in each Schengen member state for up to 3 months without a visa if he/she:
- holds a valid travel document, and
- possesses a residence card indicating that the person is a family member of an EU single market national.

Holders of a residence card of a family member of a Union citizen issued by a Schengen member state can travel to another Schengen member state without a visa, regardless of whether they are travelling independently, or accompanying or joining their EU/EEA/Swiss citizen family member.

A family member of an EU single market national satisfying the above conditions can also enter Cyprus for a stay of up to 90 days.

In theory, a family member of an EU single market national who does not fulfil the above conditions does not have to apply for a visa in advance, and can instead obtain a visa on arrival at the border checkpoint of a Schengen country or Cyprus by presenting evidence of the familial relationship.

=== School pupils resident in the EU single market or Annex II countries and territories ===
Rules for school pupils resident in the EU single market
A school pupil who is not an EU single market national, but who legally resides in the EU single market, can enter the Schengen Area and Cyprus without a visa for a short stay or transit if:
- he or she is travelling as a member of a group of school pupils from a general education school, and
- the group is accompanied by a teacher from the school, and
- the teacher can present a 'List of Travellers' form identifying the pupils on the trip, the purpose and circumstances of the intended stay/transit.

Even though a school pupil fulfilling all of the above conditions is exempt from having to obtain a visa to enter the Schengen Area and Cyprus, he or she is nonetheless required to have a valid travel document. However, he or she is exempt from having to carry a valid travel document if:

- a photograph of him or her is included in the 'List of Travellers' form, and
- the responsible authority in the member state where he/she resides endorses the 'List of Travellers' form to confirm his or her residence status and his or her right to re-entry.

Rules for school pupils resident in Annex II countries and territories
School pupils travelling in the context of a school excursion as members of a group of school pupils accompanied by a teacher from the school in question who reside in an Annex II country/territory, but hold the nationality of an Annex I country/territory, are granted visa-free entry to Cyprus (a national collective visa is required), Germany, Malta, Poland and Slovakia. In addition, those who reside in the United Kingdom are also granted visa-free entry to Belgium, Denmark, France, Italy, Liechtenstein, Luxembourg and the Netherlands.

School pupils (of any nationality and resident in any country) who require a visa for the Schengen Area or Cyprus and who are visiting for the purpose of study and/or educational training are waived the visa application fee (but are still required to submit the relevant supporting documents).

=== Refugees and stateless people resident in Ireland or Annex II countries and territories ===
Rules for refugees and stateless people
According to a table compiled by the European Commission, some Schengen countries grant visa-free entry to refugees or stateless people who reside in Ireland or in an Annex II country/territory:
- Austria, Bulgaria, Cyprus, Estonia, Greece, Latvia: none
- Belgium: refugees in Ireland, United States
- Germany, Italy: Ireland, all Annex II
- Croatia: Andorra, Canada, Ireland, Japan, Monaco, San Marino, United Kingdom, United States, Vatican City
- Czech Republic, Malta, Poland: refugees in Ireland
- Denmark, France, Iceland, Norway, Portugal, Romania, Sweden: Ireland
- Finland, Liechtenstein, Lithuania, Switzerland: Ireland, United Kingdom
- Hungary: all Annex II; refugees in Ireland
- Luxembourg, Netherlands: United Kingdom; refugees in Ireland, United States
- Slovakia: refugees in Andorra, Argentina, Australia, Brazil, Brunei, Canada, Chile, Costa Rica, El Salvador, Guatemala, Honduras, Hong Kong, Israel, Macau, Malaysia, Mexico, Monaco, New Zealand, Nicaragua, Palau, Panama, Paraguay, Singapore, United States, Uruguay, Vatican City, Venezuela
- Slovenia: Andorra, Argentina, Australia, Bosnia and Herzegovina, Brazil, Brunei, Canada, Chile, Colombia, Guatemala, Hong Kong, Ireland, Israel, Japan, Macau, Mexico, Moldova, Monaco, Montenegro, New Zealand, North Macedonia, Peru, San Marino, Serbia, Singapore, South Korea, United Arab Emirates, United Kingdom, United States, Uruguay, Vatican City, Venezuela
- Spain: refugees in Ireland; stateless people in the United Arab Emirates

=== Holders of local border traffic permits ===
Currently the local border traffic regulation agreements exist with Belarus (with Latvia since 2011), Moldova (with Romania since 2010), Russia (with Norway since 2012, with Latvia since 2013 and Poland 2012-2016^{1}) and Ukraine (with Hungary and Slovakia since 2008, Poland since 2009 and Romania since 2015). Agreement between Croatia and Bosnia and Herzegovina is pending ratification but is applied on provisional basis.

1. Poland has suspended the border traffic agreements with Russia indefinitely from 4 July 2016.

Rules for the holders of local border traffic permits
Schengen countries are authorised by virtue of the EU regulation no 1931/2006 to conclude bilateral agreements with neighbouring third countries to introduce a local border traffic permit scheme. Such permits are a type of multiple-entry visa in the form of a passport sticker or a card containing the holder's name and photo, as well as a statement that its holder is not authorised to move outside the border area and that any abuse shall be subject to penalties. The border area may include any administrative district within 30 kilometres from the external border (and, if any district extends beyond that limit, the whole district up to 50 kilometres from the border). The applicant for the permit has to show legitimate reasons to frequently cross an external land border under the local border traffic regime. The validity of the permit can be up to five years.

Holders of local border traffic permits are able to spend up to 3 months every time they enter the border area of the Schengen country which has issued the permit (this time limit is far more generous than the '90 days in a 180-day period' normally granted to third-country nationals visiting the Schengen Area).

A local border traffic permit scheme has been implemented in Hungary, Poland, Romania and Slovakia for Ukrainian nationals, is being implemented or negotiated in Poland and Lithuania regarding Belarus and Russia (Kaliningrad area), and has also been implemented in a 30 km border zone between Norway and Russia in 2012. See Schengen Area#Local border traffic at external borders.

There is also a tendency to allow more and more one-year multiple-entry visas to Russians – especially by Finland. There are plans in the EU to allow up to 5 years validity on multiple-entry visas for Russians, partly to relieve the work load at embassies.

=== Holders of non-ordinary passports ===
There are no common visa lists for holders of diplomatic and official passports. States may still maintain different policies on these.

Visa waivers maintained exclusively for diplomatic and official passports

Holders of diplomatic and official passports of Annex II countries (listed above) do not need a visa for a short stay of 90 days, except for:

- Austria, Belgium, Croatia, Cyprus, Czechia, Denmark, Estonia, Germany, Hungary, Italy, Latvia, Liechtenstein, Lithuania, Luxembourg, Malta, Netherlands, Norway, Poland, Portugal, Romania, Slovakia, Slovenia, Sweden, Switzerland: Georgia
- Bulgaria: Australia, Costa Rica, Georgia, United States
- France, Greece, Spain: Georgia, United States
- Iceland: Georgia, Mexico

In addition, holders of diplomatic and official passports of the following countries do not need a visa for:

- Austria: Azerbaijan, Bolivia, Cape Verde, Ecuador, Egypt, Indonesia, Ivory Coast, Jamaica, Maldives, Morocco, Pakistan, Philippines, South Africa, Thailand, Tunisia, Turkey; and only diplomatic passports of Armenia, Belarus, Belize, China, India, Order of Malta
- Belgium, Luxembourg, Netherlands: Bolivia, Cape Verde, Ecuador, Indonesia, Jamaica, Malawi, Morocco, South Africa, Thailand, Tunisia, Turkey; and only diplomatic passports of Armenia, Azerbaijan, Belarus, Chad, India, China, Kazakhstan, Pakistan, Senegal
- Bulgaria: Algeria, Azerbaijan, Cape Verde, China, Ecuador, India, Indonesia, Iran, Jordan, Kazakhstan, Mongolia, Morocco, North Korea, South Africa, Thailand, Tunisia, Turkey, Turkmenistan, Vietnam; and only diplomatic passports of Armenia, Belarus, Kuwait, Qatar
- Croatia: Armenia, Azerbaijan, Bolivia, Cape Verde, China, Cuba, Ecuador, Egypt, India, Indonesia, Iran, Jordan, Kazakhstan, Mongolia, Morocco, Oman, Philippines, Qatar, South Africa, Thailand, Tunisia, Turkey, Vietnam; and only diplomatic passports of Algeria, Belarus, Fiji, Kuwait
- Cyprus: Armenia, Bahrain, Cape Verde, China, Cuba, Egypt, India, Iran, Jordan, Kazakhstan, Kuwait, Lebanon, Mongolia, Morocco, Oman, Pakistan, Saudi Arabia, Syria, Vietnam; and only diplomatic passports of Azerbaijan, Belarus (biometric only), Qatar
- Czech Republic: Bolivia, Cape Verde, Egypt, Indonesia, Jordan, Laos, Mongolia, Morocco, Pakistan, Philippines, South Africa, Thailand, Turkey; and only diplomatic passports of Armenia, Azerbaijan, Belarus (biometric only), China, Ecuador, India, Kazakhstan, Kuwait, Order of Malta, Tunisia, Uzbekistan, Vietnam
- Denmark: Bolivia, Egypt, India, Indonesia, Morocco, Pakistan, Philippines, Thailand, Turkey; and only diplomatic passports of Armenia, China, Kazakhstan, Tunisia
- Estonia: Bolivia, Cape Verde, Morocco, Philippines, Thailand, Turkey; and only diplomatic passports of Armenia, Azerbaijan, Belarus (biometric only), Belize, China, Egypt, India, Jordan, Kazakhstan, Kuwait, Kyrgyzstan, Mongolia (biometric only), Suriname, Tajikistan, Tunisia, Turkmenistan, Uzbekistan, Vietnam
- Finland: Bolivia, Cape Verde, Indonesia, Pakistan, Philippines, Thailand, Turkey; and only diplomatic passports of Algeria, Armenia, Azerbaijan, Belarus (biometric only), China, India, Kazakhstan, Morocco, Tunisia
- France: Algeria, Angola, Benin, Bolivia, Cape Verde, Dominican Republic, Ecuador, Gabon, Indonesia, Morocco, Oman, Saudi Arabia, South Africa, Thailand, Tunisia, Turkey; and only diplomatic passports of Armenia, Azerbaijan, Bahrain, Belarus (biometric only), Belize, China, Congo (secured only), India, Jordan, Kazakhstan, Kuwait, Kyrgyzstan, Mongolia, Namibia, Qatar, Senegal, Vietnam
- Germany: Bolivia, Cape Verde, Chad, Ecuador, Ghana, Oman (biometric only), Philippines, Qatar (biometric only), Thailand, Turkey; and only diplomatic passports of Algeria, Armenia, Azerbaijan, Belarus (biometric only), China, Gabon (biometric only), India, Jamaica, Kazakhstan, Kuwait (biometric only), Malawi, Mongolia (biometric only), Morocco, Namibia, Pakistan, South Africa, Tunisia
- Greece: Algeria, Bahrain, Bolivia, Cape Verde, Egypt, Indonesia, Kuwait, Mongolia, Morocco, Oman, Philippines, Qatar, Saudi Arabia, South Africa, Tunisia, Turkey, Zimbabwe; and only diplomatic passports of Armenia, Azerbaijan, Belarus (biometric only), China, India, Iran, Jordan, Kazakhstan, Kyrgyzstan, Thailand, Uzbekistan, Vietnam
- Hungary: Angola, Armenia, Azerbaijan, Bahrain, Belarus (biometric only), Belize, Cambodia, Cape Verde, China, Cuba, Ecuador, Ghana, India, Indonesia, Jordan, Kazakhstan, Kuwait, Kyrgyzstan, Laos, Mongolia, Morocco, Oman, Philippines, Saudi Arabia, South Africa, Tajikistan, Thailand, Tunisia, Turkey, Turkmenistan, Vietnam; and only diplomatic passports of Algeria, Egypt, Eswatini, Iran, Lebanon, Qatar, Uzbekistan
- Iceland: India, Pakistan, South Africa, Turkey; and only diplomatic passports of China
- Italy: Algeria, Angola, Azerbaijan, Benin, Bolivia, Botswana, Burkina Faso, Cameroon, Cape Verde, Dominican Republic, Ecuador, Egypt, Eswatini, Gambia, Guyana, Indonesia, Lesotho, Libya, Mauritania, Morocco, Niger, Oman, Order of Malta, Philippines, Qatar, Saudi Arabia, South Africa, Thailand, Togo, Tunisia, Turkey, Uganda; and only diplomatic passports of Armenia, Bahrain, Belarus (biometric only), China, India, Jordan, Kazakhstan, Kuwait, Kyrgyzstan, Mongolia, Mozambique, Senegal, Tajikistan, Uzbekistan, Vietnam
- Latvia: Armenia, Azerbaijan, Cape Verde, Kuwait, Mongolia, Turkey; and only diplomatic passports of Belarus (biometric only), China, India, Kazakhstan, Uzbekistan
- Lithuania: Azerbaijan, Cape Verde, China, Indonesia, Mongolia, Oman, Philippines, South Africa, Turkey; and only diplomatic passports of Armenia, Belarus (biometric only), Egypt, India, Jordan, Kazakhstan, Kyrgyzstan, Morocco, Vietnam
- Malta: Algeria, Cape Verde, China, Egypt, Ghana, Iran, Kuwait, Libya, Mongolia, Morocco, Oman, Order of Malta, Pakistan, Saudi Arabia, South Africa, Tunisia, Turkey; and only diplomatic passports of Armenia, Azerbaijan, Belarus (biometric only), Belize, Cambodia, Cuba, Ecuador, Eswatini, Gambia, Guyana, India, Indonesia, Jamaica, Jordan, Kazakhstan, Kenya, Kyrgyzstan, Lebanon, Lesotho, Maldives, Mauritania, Namibia, Nepal, Nigeria, Palestine, Philippines, Qatar, Sierra Leone, Sri Lanka, Thailand, Turkmenistan, Uganda, Uzbekistan, Vietnam, Zambia
- Norway: Bolivia, Indonesia, Morocco, Pakistan, Philippines, South Africa, Thailand, Turkey; and only diplomatic passports of Armenia, Azerbaijan, China, India, Jordan, Kazakhstan, Laos, Tunisia
- Poland: Algeria, Cape Verde, China, Ecuador, Indonesia, Laos, Mongolia, Morocco, Order of Malta, Philippines, Saudi Arabia, South Africa, Thailand, Tunisia, Turkey; and only diplomatic passports of Angola, Armenia, Azerbaijan, Belarus (biometric only), Egypt, India, Iran, Kazakhstan, Kuwait, Kyrgyzstan, Qatar, Uzbekistan, Vietnam
- Portugal: Algeria, Angola, Azerbaijan, Bolivia, Cape Verde, Ecuador, Egypt, Equatorial Guinea, Guinea-Bissau, Indonesia, Iran, Kuwait, Morocco, Mozambique, Oman, São Tomé and Príncipe, Saudi Arabia, South Africa, Tunisia, Turkey; and only diplomatic passports of Armenia, Belarus (biometric only), China, Congo, India, Kazakhstan, Qatar, Senegal
- Romania: Armenia, Azerbaijan, Belarus (biometric only), Bolivia, Cambodia, Cape Verde, Central African Republic, China, Congo, Cuba, Ecuador, Egypt, Ghana, Guinea, Indonesia, Iran, Kuwait, Kyrgyzstan, Mauritania, Mongolia, Morocco, Oman, Pakistan, Philippines, Qatar, São Tomé and Príncipe, Senegal, Sierra Leone, South Africa, Tajikistan, Tanzania, Thailand, Tunisia, Turkey, Turkmenistan, Vietnam, Zambia; and only diplomatic passports of India, Jordan, Kazakhstan, Uzbekistan
- Slovakia: Algeria, Azerbaijan, Belarus (biometric only), Bolivia, Cambodia, Cape Verde, China, Egypt, Indonesia, Jordan, Kazakhstan, Laos, Mongolia, Morocco, Pakistan, Philippines, South Africa, Thailand, Tunisia, Turkey, Turkmenistan, Uzbekistan; and only diplomatic passports of Armenia, Cuba, Kyrgyzstan, Vietnam
- Slovenia: Azerbaijan, Bolivia, Cape Verde, China, Cuba, Egypt, Indonesia, Libya, Mongolia, Morocco, Order of Malta, Philippines, Thailand, Tunisia, Turkey, Vietnam; and only diplomatic passports of Armenia, Belarus (biometric only), Ecuador, India, Jamaica, Kazakhstan, Maldives
- Spain: Algeria, Bolivia, Cape Verde, Ecuador, Egypt, Morocco, Order of Malta, Philippines, Saudi Arabia, Tunisia, Turkey; and only diplomatic passports of Angola, Armenia, Azerbaijan, Belarus (biometric only), China, Dominican Republic, Guyana, India, Jordan, Kazakhstan, Kuwait, Mauritania, Qatar, Senegal, South Africa, Thailand, Vietnam
- Sweden: Bolivia, Cape Verde, Philippines, Thailand, Turkey; and only diplomatic passports of Armenia, Azerbaijan, Belarus (biometric only), China, India, Morocco, Tunisia
- Switzerland, Liechtenstein: Algeria, Angola, Azerbaijan (biometric only), Benin, Bhutan, Bolivia, Botswana, Cameroon, Cuba, Dominican Republic, Ecuador, Guyana, Indonesia, Ivory Coast, Jamaica, Kazakhstan, Kuwait, Laos, Mongolia, Morocco, Namibia, Oman, Philippines, Qatar, South Africa, Thailand, Turkey; and only diplomatic passports of Armenia, China, India, Iran, Kyrgyzstan, Lebanon, Tunisia, Vietnam

Holders of a United Nations laissez-passer, regardless of nationality, do not need a valid visa for up to 90 days in the Schengen Area and Cyprus.

=== Airport transit ===
In general, a passenger who transits through one single airport in the Schengen Area and Cyprus while remaining airside in the international transit area less than one day will not require a visa (transit privilege). This only applies if the transfer is possible without leaving the international transit area, which depends on the connecting flight and airport layout.

However, on 5 April 2010, common visa requirements for airport transit were introduced by the European Union. Nationals of the following 12 countries are required to hold an airport transit visa (ATV) when transiting through any airport in the Schengen Area or Cyprus, even if they remain airside:

- Afghanistan
- Bangladesh
- DR Congo
- Eritrea
- Ethiopia
- Ghana
- Iran
- Iraq
- Nigeria
- Pakistan
- Somalia
- Sri Lanka

Additionally, individual Schengen countries can impose airport transit visa requirements for nationals of other countries in urgent cases of mass influx of illegal immigrants. For example, nationals of Syria need ATVs for many but not all Schengen countries.

However, nationals of all these countries are exempt from airport transit visas if they hold a visa or residence permit for an EU single market country, Canada, Japan, United States or the Caribbean part of the Kingdom of the Netherlands, a residence permit for Andorra, Gibraltar, Monaco, San Marino or the United Kingdom, a diplomatic passport, are family members of an EU single market national, or are flight crew members.

Additional nationalities (with ordinary passports) required to have an ATV in some Schengen countries
- Austria: Syria
- Belgium: Burundi, Dominican Republic, Guinea, Guinea-Bissau, Haiti, Nepal, Palestine, South Sudan, Sudan, Syria, Tajikistan, Turkey, Uzbekistan, Yemen
- Cyprus: Cameroon, Sudan, Turkey
- Czech Republic: Algeria, Armenia, Chad, Cuba, Egypt, India, Lebanon, Libya, Mali, Mauritania, Niger, Palestine, Russia, South Sudan, Sudan, Syria, Turkey, Yemen
- Denmark: Syria
- France: Angola, Bolivia, Cameroon, Central African Republic, Chad, Congo, Cuba, Dominican Republic, Guinea, Haiti, Ivory Coast, Mali, Mauritania, Nepal, Palestine (only with refugee travel documents), Philippines, Russia (only if arriving from Armenia, Azerbaijan, Belarus, Egypt, Georgia, Moldova, Turkey or Ukraine), Senegal, Sierra Leone, South Sudan, Sudan, Syria, Togo, Turkey, Uzbekistan
- Germany: Cuba, Jordan (except if travelling to or from Australia, Israel or New Zealand, with a valid visa for that country), Lebanon, Mali, South Sudan, Sudan, Syria, Turkey
- Greece: Cameroon, Congo, Sudan, Syria
- Italy: Senegal, Syria, Tajikistan, Uzbekistan
- Netherlands: Central African Republic, Chad, Cuba, Guinea, Guinea-Bissau, Mauritania, Nepal, Senegal, Sierra Leone, South Sudan, Sudan, Syria, Turkey, Yemen
- Norway: Syria, Turkey
- Poland: Armenia, Cuba, Egypt
- Portugal: Guinea, Senegal, Uzbekistan
- Romania: Egypt, India, Lebanon, Morocco, Nepal, Palestine, Syria, Tajikistan, Tunisia, Uzbekistan, Yemen
- Spain: Burkina Faso, Cameroon, Central African Republic, Chad, Congo, Cuba, Djibouti, Egypt, Gambia, Guinea, Guinea-Bissau, Haiti (only with passports issued from 1 September 2021), Ivory Coast, Kenya, Liberia, Mali, Mauritania, Nepal, Palestine, Russia, Senegal, Sierra Leone, Sudan, Syria, Tajikistan, Togo, Turkey, Uzbekistan, Yemen
- Switzerland: Cuba, Syria, Turkey
- Bulgaria, Croatia, Estonia, Finland, Hungary, Iceland, Latvia, Lithuania, Luxembourg, Malta, Slovakia, Slovenia, Sweden: no additional nationalities beyond common ATV list
- Liechtenstein: no airports exist in this country

== Visas ==
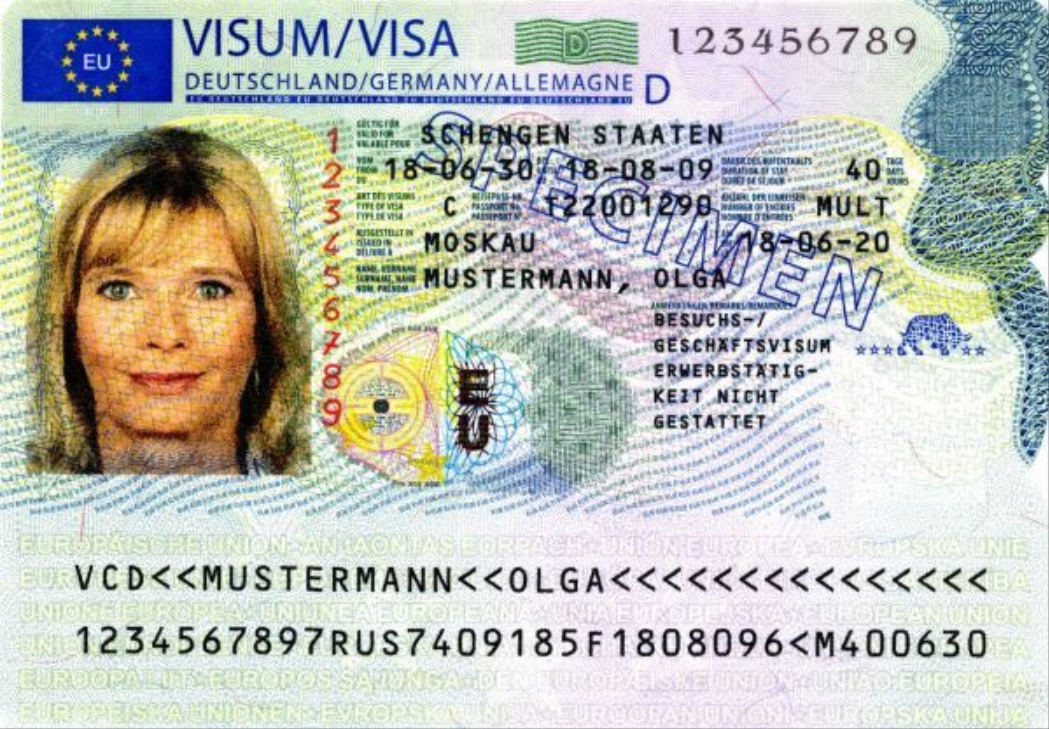
Schengen visa issued by Germany

Schengen visas can be issued by any member state of the Schengen Area. Travellers must apply to the embassy or consulate of the country which they intend to visit. In cases of travellers visiting multiple countries in the Schengen Area, travellers must apply to their main destination's embassy or consulate. If the main destination cannot be determined, the traveller should apply for the visa at the embassy of the Schengen member state of first entry. Often, external service providers are contracted by certain diplomatic missions to process, collect and return visa applications.

Schengen visa applications may not be submitted more than six months prior to the proposed date of entry into the Schengen Area. All countries' embassies may require applicants to provide biometric identifiers (ten fingerprints and a digital photograph) as part of the visa application process to be stored on the Visa Information System (VIS). Biometric identifiers are not collected from children under the age of 12. Travellers applying for a Schengen visa for the first time must apply in person and are subject to an interview by the consular officers. If biometric identifiers have been provided within the past 59 months, the applicant may not be required to provide biometric identifiers again. Providing that the visa application is admissible and there are no issues with the application, a decision must be given within 15 calendar days of the date on which the application was lodged.

The standard application fee for a Schengen visa is EUR 90. There is a reduced fee of EUR 45 for children aged 6 to 12, and no fee for children under age 6, for applicants intending to undertake study, educational training or scientific research, and for applicants under age 25 representing non-profit organisations. In some cases the visa fee may be waived for children under age 18, for holders of diplomatic and service passports, and for applicants under age 25 participating in events by non-profit organisations, and may be waived or reduced in order to 'promote cultural or sporting interests, interests in the field of foreign policy, development policy and other areas of vital public interest, or for humanitarian reasons or because of international obligations'. If the applicant's country of nationality is considered not to be cooperating on the readmission of irregular migrants, the visa fee may be increased up to EUR 180, except for children under age 12. If a visa application is submitted to an external service provider, an additional service fee up to EUR 120 may be required.

Schengen visas are valid for any country in the Schengen Area unless marked otherwise. Cyprus also accepts double and multiple-entry Schengen visas, for stays of up to 90 days in a 180-day period, except for nationals of Turkey and Azerbaijan. However, visas issued by Cyprus are not valid for travel to the Schengen Area.

The Schengen Convention and Schengen Borders Code permit member states to require third-country nationals to report their presence to a police station within 3 working days of crossing an internal border. This requirement varies by country and can usually be performed by hotels instead.

Since the global loosening of COVID-19 lockdown rules and the rebound in travel demand, Schengen nation embassies have come under immense criticism for long visa processing times and unavailability of visa appointments. The general lack of competition for visa outsourcing contracts, which are dominated by companies such as VFS Global, BLS International and TLScontact, has also been blamed for the poor service.

This has partly spurred the EU to further digitalise the process. It is planning to introduce a unified online visa application platform named EU VAP (EU VAP: European Union Visa Application Platform) at the EU and Schengen level, replacing the separated national platforms. The platform will be built by eu-LISA and is scheduled to be introduced in 2026. A transition period for all member states to migrate to the single platform is scheduled to last until 2031. The European Parliament voted on 18 October 2023 to introduce the digital application system and for cryptographically signed visas. In almost all cases, applications for Schengen visas will be made through a single website.

=== Number of entries and validity period ===
Schengen visas may be issued for one, two or multiple entries, with a validity period up to five years. Under the standard rules, new applicants are granted visas valid only for their intended trips, then after using three visas in the previous two years they qualify for a multiple-entry visa valid for one year, then for two years, then for five years. However, applicants who justify their need for frequent travel may be granted a multiple-entry visa with a longer validity without satisfying the previous requirements.

The EU Commission may set different rules about multiple-entry visas for specific countries. For example:

- The maximum validity of multiple-entry visas is two years if issued in Algeria and Iran, and three years if issued in Ghana.
- Nationals of Bahrain, Belize, Kuwait, Oman, Qatar and Saudi Arabia are granted multiple-entry visas valid for five years even if applying for the first time.
- Nationals of India who used two visas in the previous three years qualify for a multiple-entry visa valid for two years, then for five years.
- Nationals of Indonesia who used a visa in the previous three years qualify for a multiple-entry visa valid for five years.
- Nationals of Russia who do not justify their need for frequent travel are granted multiple-entry visas only if they are spouses, children or parents of EU citizens or residents, valid for one year, or if they are transportation workers, valid for nine months.
- Nationals of Thailand who used a visa in the previous two years qualify for a multiple-entry visa valid for one year, then for two years, then for five years.
- Nationals of Turkey who used a visa in the previous year qualify for a multiple-entry visa valid for six months, then for one year, then for three years, then for five years.
- Permanent residents of the United States who used a visa in the previous three years qualify for a multiple-entry visa valid for one year, then for two years, then for five years.

=== Visa facilitation agreements ===
The EU has concluded visa facilitation agreements with several countries, which allow facilitated procedures for issuing visas for both EU citizens and nationals of partner countries. The facilitated procedures include faster visa processing times, reduced or no fees, and reduced list of supporting documents. These agreements are also linked to readmission agreements that allow the return of people irregularly residing in the EU.

Visa facilitation agreements
Country	Entry into force	Notes
Armenia	1 January 2014	
Azerbaijan	1 September 2014	
Belarus	1 July 2020	Suspended for Belarusian government officials from 12 November 2021
Cape Verde	1 December 2014	Amended from 7 October 2021
Albania	1 January 2008	Visa waiver from 15 December 2010
Bosnia and Herzegovina	1 January 2008	Visa waiver from 15 December 2010
Georgia	1 March 2011	Visa waiver from 28 March 2017
Moldova	1 January 2008	Amended from 1 July 2013, visa waiver from 28 April 2014
Montenegro	1 January 2008	Visa waiver from 19 December 2009
North Macedonia	1 January 2008	Visa waiver from 19 December 2009
Russia	1 June 2007	Fully suspended from 9 September 2022
Serbia	1 January 2008	Visa waiver from 19 December 2009
Ukraine	1 July 2013	Visa waiver from 11 June 2017

=== Working holiday visas ===
Many Schengen countries have signed bilateral agreements for working holiday visas with other countries, which allow their nationals to travel and work in each other's country for up to one year. These visas are for individual countries and not for the whole Schengen Area. All Schengen countries have working holiday visa programs except Bulgaria and Liechtenstein.

Working holiday visas for Schengen countries
Schengen country	Other countries	Notes
Austria	Argentina; Australia; Canada; Chile; Hong Kong; India; Israel; Japan; New Zealand; South Korea; Taiwan; United States	Up to 12 months; 150 Euro fee for Visa D - WHP.; Health, accident and travel insurance.; Proof of departure prior to arrival.; Valid passport.
Belgium	Australia; Canada; New Zealand; South Korea; Taiwan	Being between 18 and 30 years old.; Valid passport.; Return ticket or having sufficient funds.; Never participated in the program.; Proof of no criminal record.; Proof of no diseases that may endanger public health.; Insurance.; Demonstrating the purpose of the stay.
Croatia	Canada; Chile; New Zealand; South Korea	Being between 18 and 30 years old.; Being between 18 and 35 years old (for Canadian).; Valid passport.; Having sufficient funds.
Czech Republic	Australia; Canada; Chile; Israel; Japan; New Zealand; Peru; South Korea; Taiwan	Up to one year.; Being between 18 and 30 years old.; Valid passport.; Having sufficient funds.
Denmark	Argentina; Australia; Canada; Chile; Japan; New Zealand; South Korea	Up to one year.; Being between 18 and 30 years old (for Argentina, Chile, Japan, and New Zealand).; Being between 18 and 35 years old (for Australia, Canada, and South Korea).; Valid passport.; Having sufficient funds.
Estonia	Australia; Canada; Japan; New Zealand; South Korea	Up to one year.; Being between 18 and 30 years old (18 - 35 for Canadian).
Finland	Australia; Canada; Japan; New Zealand; South Korea	Up to one year.; Being between 18 and 30 years old (for Japan, and New Zealand).; Being between 18 and 35 years old (for Australia, Canada and South Korea).; Valid passport.; Having sufficient funds.; No entry ban, not being a danger to the public health, order and security, and not to Finland's international relations.
France	Argentina; Australia; Brazil; Canada; Chile; Colombia; Ecuador; Hong Kong; Japan; Mexico; New Zealand; Peru; South Korea; Taiwan; Uruguay	Up to one year.; Being between 18 and 30 years old.; Being between 18 and 35 years old (for Argentina, Australia, Canada, and South Korea).
Germany	Andorra; Argentina; Australia; Brazil; Canada; Chile; Hong Kong; Israel; Japan; New Zealand; South Korea; Taiwan; Uruguay	Up to 12 months.; Being between 18 and 30 years old.; Being between 18 and 34 years old for South Koreans.
Greece	Australia; Canada	Up to 12 months.; Being between 18 and 30 years old (Australia) or between 18 and 35 years old (Canada).
Hungary	Argentina; Australia; Chile; Colombia; Ecuador; Hong Kong; Japan; New Zealand; South Korea; Taiwan	Up to 12 months.; Being between 18 and 35 years old.
Iceland	Andorra; Canada; Chile; Japan; United Kingdom	No visa fees for applicants from Japan.
Italy	Australia; Canada; Hong Kong; Japan; New Zealand; South Korea	Up to one year.; Work permit up to 6 months between two different employers for 3 months.
Latvia	Australia; Canada; Japan; New Zealand; South Korea	
Lithuania	Canada; Japan; New Zealand; South Korea	
Luxembourg	Australia; Canada; Chile; Japan; New Zealand; South Korea; Taiwan	Up to one year.; Being between 18 and 30 years old (for Australia, Japan, and New Zealand).; Being between 18 and 35 years old (for Canada, Chile, South Korea, and Taiwan).; Valid passport.; Having sufficient funds.
Malta	Australia; Japan; New Zealand; South Korea	Valid passport.
Netherlands	Argentina; Australia; Canada; Hong Kong; Japan; New Zealand; South Korea; Taiwan; Uruguay	Up to one year.; Being between 18 and 30 years old.
Norway	Andorra; Argentina; Australia; Canada; Japan; New Zealand; South Korea	Up to one year.; Being between 18 and 30 years old or up to 35 years old if Canadian.
Poland	Argentina; Australia; Canada; Chile; Japan; New Zealand; Peru; South Korea; Taiwan	Up to one year.; Being between 18 and 30 years old.
Portugal	Argentina; Australia; Canada; Chile; Japan; New Zealand; Peru; South Korea; United States; Uruguay	Up to 12 months.
Romania	South Korea	Up to 12 months.; Valid passport.
Slovakia	Argentina; Australia; Canada; Japan; New Zealand; South Korea; Taiwan	
Slovenia	Argentina; Australia; Canada; New Zealand; South Korea	
Spain	Argentina; Australia; Canada; Chile; Japan; New Zealand; South Korea	
Sweden	Argentina; Australia; Canada; Chile; Hong Kong; Japan; New Zealand; Peru; South Korea; Uruguay	Up to one year.; Being between 18 and 30 years old.
Switzerland	Australia; Chile; Canada	
Working holiday visas for other EU member states
EU member state	Other countries	Notes
Cyprus	Australia	Being between 18 and 30 years old.; Valid passport.; Having sufficient funds.
Ireland	Andorra; Argentina; Australia; Canada; Chile; Hong Kong; Japan; New Zealand; South Korea; Taiwan; United States	
Working holiday visas for other countries with open borders with EU member states
Country with open border	Other countries	Notes
Andorra	Canada; Germany; Iceland; Ireland; Norway; South Korea; United Kingdom	Valid passport.
Monaco	United Kingdom	Valid passport.; Up to 2 years.
San Marino	Australia; Canada; South Korea; United Kingdom	Valid passport.
United Kingdom	Andorra; Australia; Canada; Hong Kong; Iceland; India; Japan; Monaco; New Zealand; San Marino; South Korea; Taiwan; Uruguay	Valid passport.; Being between 18 and 30 years old.; Being between 18 and 35 years old for Australia, Canada, New Zealand, South Korea.

=== At the border ===
In exceptional cases, single-entry Schengen visas valid for up to 15 days may be issued on arrival at the border. These visas are reserved for individuals who can prove that they were unable to apply for a visa in advance due to time constraints arising out of 'unforeseeable' and 'imperative' reasons as long as they fulfil the regular criteria for the issuing of a Schengen visa. However, if the individual requesting a Schengen visa at the border falls within a category of people for which it is necessary to consult one or more of the central authorities of other Schengen states, they may only be issued a visa at the border in exceptional cases on humanitarian grounds, on grounds of national interest or on account of international obligations (such as the death or sudden serious illness of a close relative or of another close person). People trying this way to travel to the Schengen Area can be denied boarding by the airline because of the carrier's responsibility, which penalises airlines if they carry passengers who do not have the correct documentation.

=== Visas with limited territorial validity ===
In exceptional cases, Schengen states may issue visas with limited territorial validity (LTV), either specifically naming the state(s) for which it is valid or, inversely, the state(s) for which it is not valid. According to the Schengen Visa Code, member states may issue LTV visas when a consulate deems it justifiable to overcome the three-month limitation in six months, when a member state considers it necessary due to pressing circumstances to derogate from entry conditions as set by Schengen Borders Code, to overcome objections of other member states, or in cases of urgency.

=== Unrecognised travel documents ===
Schengen visas are only issued on travel documents of UN member states, Kosovo, Palestine, Taiwan, Vatican City, the Order of Malta, and certain international organisations (Council of Europe, EU, NATO, Red Cross, UN). Belgium and France also accept the passport of Somaliland. Passports of Abkhazia, Northern Cyprus, South Ossetia, Transnistria and Western Sahara are not accepted.

=== Statistics ===
Most Schengen visas, including visas with limited territorial validity, were issued at consulates of Schengen states located in the countries listed below. Visas issued in a country were not necessarily for nationals of that country.

By location of consulates
Location of consulates	2025		2024		2023		2022		2021		2020		2019		2018	
Location of consulates	Visas issued	Refusal rate	Visas issued	Refusal rate	Visas issued	Refusal rate	Visas issued	Refusal rate	Visas issued	Refusal rate	Visas issued	Refusal rate	Visas issued	Refusal rate	Visas issued	Refusal rate
China	1,828,206	4.0%	1,686,115	4.6%	1,043,591	5.5%	80,048	9.3%	24,320	8.7%	202,384	4.8%	2,847,214	3.8%	2,708,477	3.7%
Turkey	1,072,328	14.6%	1,000,062	14.5%	881,257	16.1%	647,691	15.7%	221,125	16.9%	198,312	12.7%	813,498	9.7%	800,706	8.5%
India	966,890	15.8%	939,697	15.0%	811,642	15.8%	541,440	18.3%	98,036	23.3%	138,670	16.9%	1,013,839	10.8%	975,858	9.4%
Russia	630,605	6.4%	552,629	7.5%	459,198	10.6%	604,926	10.2%	514,655	3.2%	635,663	2.6%	4,055,698	1.5%	3,632,492	1.6%
Saudi Arabia	521,996	5.2%	471,863	5.9%	399,223	6.0%	333,636	5.2%	161,955	4.3%	43,063	8.4%	368,188	5.7%	327,747	7.7%
Morocco	481,428	19.2%	459,684	20.1%	437,795	23.8%	283,020	29.7%	103,660	27.6%	135,868	23.6%	545,903	21.0%	530,758	18.4%
United Kingdom	452,768	10.5%	433,943	6.9%	379,848	5.7%	261,173	4.2%	66,007	5.0%	70,878	8.1%	259,788	4.4%	267,937	1.5%
Algeria	303,129	31.3%	343,577	35.0%	300,906	35.6%	192,639	48.2%	84,336	32.0%	87,676	38.0%	376,151	43.3%	385,930	45.7%
Thailand	247,830	5.9%	247,708	6.2%	252,090	6.7%	189,600	8.2%	27,826	13.3%	70,484	8.0%	323,112	3.9%	319,974	3.4%
United Arab Emirates	223,588	24.2%	198,093	23.8%	177,213	22.8%	143,553	22.7%	58,303	22.1%	32,802	20.6%	182,468	18.8%	176,409	18.1%
Philippines	218,122	6.9%	203,572	6.1%	187,846	5.9%	143,671	5.1%	75,150	2.7%	59,796	5.0%	172,132	8.3%	159,937	8.3%
Indonesia	209,620	5.2%	193,265	4.3%	195,810	5.5%	125,330	5.1%	25,654	5.2%	44,837	3.2%	221,921	2.4%	205,581	1.8%
South Africa	184,047	5.3%	180,631	5.7%	192,949	4.8%	155,580	5.3%	22,903	6.1%	31,646	6.3%	217,170	3.3%	215,305	2.4%
United States	178,038	4.9%	196,139	4.0%	169,502	3.8%	112,946	4.2%	29,786	4.5%	28,115	3.8%	164,120	3.0%	154,510	2.0%
Egypt	170,564	24.2%	153,419	25.7%	139,519	25.2%	133,888	18.9%	45,513	17.0%	33,456	21.6%	159,919	19.1%	148,649	20.3%
Kazakhstan	163,464	9.1%	163,511	9.0%	144,129	9.0%	96,590	8.2%	18,077	11.0%	29,516	10.0%	160,417	7.0%	149,636	4.8%
Belarus	152,792	2.3%	157,419	3.5%	158,121	3.4%	118,557	1.9%	57,500	1.1%	134,834	0.3%	643,669	0.3%	677,173	0.3%
Tunisia	150,068	19.6%	137,496	21.7%	122,882	24.0%	112,718	30.3%	44,721	24.8%	49,796	29.0%	181,228	24.9%	186,566	18.6%
Kuwait	137,333	5.7%	158,168	6.7%	166,923	6.7%	138,371	5.0%	51,027	3.3%	16,739	8.2%	153,428	5.9%	165,575	4.9%
Vietnam	104,716	9.4%	97,828	10.8%	90,918	12.1%	71,924	8.7%	2,104	5.3%	10,494	12.8%	122,137	11.7%	114,036	9.5%
Armenia	98,819	10.9%	86,634	12.3%	69,480	13.2%	53,764	12.8%	11,072	10.4%	8,593	14.3%	51,098	13.2%	52,099	11.8%
Lebanon	97,595	17.3%	95,739	16.9%	95,001	18.3%	80,285	18.5%	41,446	21.3%	26,342	24.4%	136,439	13.6%	135,407	12.2%
Azerbaijan	93,496	9.8%	81,516	9.7%	72,159	8.4%	47,589	8.2%	12,670	7.3%	10,702	11.1%	57,585	10.3%	52,495	10.6%
Qatar	86,383	15.1%	87,157	15.9%	87,387	14.8%	70,060	11.2%	41,527	4.7%	14,088	10.6%	86,504	8.0%	83,085	8.0%
Iran	74,403	29.1%	121,487	26.0%	111,084	30.3%	100,170	25.2%	20,509	20.1%	25,892	36.2%	148,780	33.5%	190,478	29.7%
Ecuador	71,399	30.9%	71,953	29.6%	69,122	24.4%	57,156	22.2%	23,696	17.6%	12,777	17.9%	63,140	15.0%	56,043	16.4%
Others	1,386,113	29.0%	1,339,641	27.1%	1,379,966	25.9%	1,183,788	25.0%	566,585	16.7%	366,412	24.0%	1,625,885	22.5%	1,506,106	21.3%
Total	10,305,740	14.6%	9,858,946	14.8%	8,595,561	16.0%	6,080,113	17.9%	2,450,163	13.4%	2,519,835	13.6%	15,151,431	10.0%	14,378,969	9.7%

By issuing state
Issuing state	2025		2024		2023		2022		2021		2020		2019		2018	
Issuing state	Visas issued	Refusal rate	Visas issued	Refusal rate	Visas issued	Refusal rate	Visas issued	Refusal rate	Visas issued	Refusal rate	Visas issued	Refusal rate	Visas issued	Refusal rate	Visas issued	Refusal rate
Austria	215,259	11.9%	226,191	13.7%	196,691	14.3%	127,044	15.9%	40,178	9.9%	42,502	5.6%	312,836	5.1%	287,035	6.2%
Belgium	190,648	26.1%	189,126	24.6%	166,454	26.5%	117,269	28.4%	34,902	20.4%	35,910	23.6%	190,771	19.6%	174,511	17.5%
Bulgaria	152,478	12.5%	117,984	9.4%	—N/a	—N/a	—N/a	—N/a	—N/a	—N/a	—N/a	—N/a	—N/a	—N/a	—N/a	—N/a
Croatia	34,462	18.5%	33,555	19.3%	30,161	20.0%	—N/a	—N/a	—N/a	—N/a	—N/a	—N/a	—N/a	—N/a	—N/a	—N/a
Czech Republic	148,256	14.2%	126,894	15.8%	114,610	17.4%	100,683	14.4%	200,456	3.3%	167,498	5.5%	700,889	5.3%	631,581	4.7%
Denmark	139,746	21.7%	99,862	23.7%	79,885	21.2%	56,509	18.9%	19,511	21.1%	27,079	11.8%	148,267	8.9%	149,898	7.1%
Estonia	9,034	24.6%	8,811	27.2%	8,801	33.1%	18,117	20.0%	38,389	5.4%	24,969	1.5%	143,647	1.4%	125,513	1.6%
Finland	78,218	13.4%	75,614	15.2%	72,973	18.5%	144,885	9.7%	55,882	4.7%	132,936	3.7%	877,759	1.9%	754,410	1.8%
France	2,652,384	14.2%	2,558,234	15.8%	2,175,644	16.7%	1,431,749	22.2%	481,618	21.1%	553,539	18.5%	3,294,696	16.2%	3,348,711	15.8%
Germany	1,296,766	13.1%	1,298,650	13.7%	1,246,078	14.3%	869,465	16.2%	286,531	15.9%	353,581	14.1%	1,958,003	9.8%	1,869,597	9.1%
Greece	598,072	14.5%	611,396	13.2%	530,435	14.7%	396,432	12.5%	274,836	6.3%	98,279	8.4%	835,865	4.5%	813,272	4.9%
Hungary	228,569	13.0%	219,370	12.8%	183,356	15.1%	122,737	15.1%	66,397	4.8%	39,947	9.1%	217,220	7.9%	211,031	7.8%
Iceland	57,753	13.8%	32,323	6.6%	21,253	2.2%	7,412	1.9%	2,410	9.7%	3,115	4.0%	18,020	1.2%	8,856	1.7%
Italy	1,187,811	10.8%	1,098,999	10.9%	974,540	12.0%	632,453	12.7%	191,876	9.8%	259,869	11.5%	1,895,964	7.7%	1,708,258	7.4%
Latvia	17,041	12.3%	15,623	10.9%	16,689	11.7%	19,030	9.5%	16,182	3.5%	29,630	2.7%	163,339	2.4%	157,711	2.1%
Lithuania	35,886	14.4%	28,511	14.1%	26,552	12.8%	24,138	7.8%	23,998	2.8%	65,216	2.1%	354,373	1.3%	346,626	1.3%
Luxembourg	11,387	14.7%	11,261	12.7%	9,291	12.7%	6,018	10.5%	2,296	1.2%	2,439	5.2%	11,270	3.9%	10,475	3.7%
Malta	33,174	38.4%	27,022	38.5%	20,311	37.6%	13,801	36.4%	3,577	16.2%	4,664	27.8%	27,773	19.7%	25,123	20.8%
Netherlands	610,101	17.7%	604,810	15.5%	544,401	17.3%	335,015	17.4%	117,946	13.5%	138,497	16.8%	632,246	13.3%	585,458	13.2%
Norway	152,671	15.7%	130,796	12.8%	92,361	15.9%	57,744	20.3%	7,886	26.2%	18,045	16.2%	168,561	5.6%	149,086	9.5%
Poland	92,334	15.8%	92,474	17.2%	106,517	14.8%	74,900	11.6%	39,915	5.6%	98,891	4.8%	438,510	3.6%	509,938	3.2%
Portugal	194,562	23.3%	174,262	11.3%	174,540	16.0%	123,534	18.1%	40,709	12.1%	39,653	30.0%	236,920	20.3%	222,337	16.6%
Romania	47,896	11.5%	31,730	9.4%	—N/a	—N/a	—N/a	—N/a	—N/a	—N/a	—N/a	—N/a	—N/a	—N/a	—N/a	—N/a
Slovakia	16,232	9.6%	12,850	9.9%	11,808	12.9%	11,026	9.7%	3,806	2.7%	4,192	4.0%	23,671	6.1%	25,680	4.2%
Slovenia	15,883	21.4%	13,630	24.5%	16,724	15.6%	13,915	18.1%	5,616	7.6%	4,574	14.8%	25,068	10.1%	23,771	10.0%
Spain	1,403,252	14.6%	1,313,769	15.7%	1,107,942	18.5%	920,773	19.8%	380,930	15.5%	265,112	17.4%	1,675,736	10.3%	1,508,567	9.5%
Sweden	143,913	23.3%	140,786	24.0%	128,680	23.1%	94,691	29.0%	15,061	30.6%	27,369	23.0%	236,290	12.5%	216,234	12.0%
Switzerland	541,952	12.5%	564,413	11.3%	538,864	10.7%	360,773	12.0%	99,255	13.0%	82,329	10.8%	563,737	7.8%	515,290	7.4%
Total	10,305,740	14.6%	9,858,946	14.8%	8,595,561	16.0%	6,080,113	17.9%	2,450,163	13.4%	2,519,835	13.6%	15,151,431	10.0%	14,378,969	9.7%

== Proposed changes ==
=== Freedom of movement ===
- Andorra San Marino – In 2024, the EU proposed association agreements with Andorra and San Marino, which would extend to nationals of these countries and their family members the right to reside and work in all EU member states. The EU also proposed separate agreements which would grant a visa exemption for short stays in the Schengen Area to holders of residence permits issued by Andorra and San Marino. The EU Council authorized the signature and provisional application of the Association Agreement with San Marino and Andorra, on 16 July 2026.

=== Visa exemptions ===
- Armenia – In November 2025, the EU Commission presented to Armenian officials an action plan on visa liberalisation, establishing the conditions to be met before visa-free travel can be implemented.
- Bahrain Kuwait Oman Qatar Saudi Arabia – In 2022, the EU Council proposed a visa exemption for nationals of all countries of the Gulf Cooperation Council that were not yet exempt. In 2026, the EU Council adopted resolutions for each country, launching the formal process of visa waiver for them.
- Belize – In 2024, EU and Belizean officials continued meeting to discuss a Schengen visa waiver.
- Ecuador – In 2022, the EU Parliament proposed a visa exemption for nationals of Ecuador.
- Fiji – In 2023, EU and Fijian officials met to discuss potential visa-free travel for nationals of Fiji to the Schengen Area.
- Guyana – In July 2023, Guyanese President Irfaan Ali stated that at least five EU countries had agreed to sponsor a proposal for a visa exemption for nationals of Guyana.
- Indonesia – In 2020, Indonesian Minister of Law and Human Rights Yasonna Laoly met with ambassadors from 20 EU member states to discuss a reciprocal visa-free scheme.
- Kazakhstan – In October 2024, officials of the EU and Kazakhstan expressed their readiness to begin negotiations for a visa facilitation agreement.
- Maldives – In December 2022, Maldivian Foreign Minister Abdulla Shahid discussed with EU diplomats the possibility of securing a visa waiver for Maldivian nationals wishing to enter the Schengen Area.
- Nauru – In 2014, the EU approved a visa waiver for nationals of several countries, including Nauru, contingent on a reciprocal agreement to be signed with each country. All of these countries, except Nauru, concluded such agreements by 2016.
- Russia – In 2014, the EU suspended talks for visa-free travel with Russia as a result of the War in Donbas. In 2019, German officials suggested a visa-free regime for young Russians. In 2022, the EU fully suspended its visa facilitation agreement with Russia as a result of the Russian invasion of Ukraine.
- Thailand – In 2024, Thai Prime Minister Srettha Thavisin met with French President Emmanuel Macron and gained his support for a visa-free agreement with the EU.
- Turkey – In 2023, EU and Turkish officials met to discuss progress in the conditions for visa liberalisation.

== Reciprocity ==
Visa requirements for the European Union citizens European Union (EU) Freedom of movement (EFTA) Visa not required / ETA for all EU citizens (Note: ETA required for Australia*, Canada if arriving by air, Israel, Kenya, Mozambique, New Zealand, Saint Kitts and Nevis, Seychelles, Sri Lanka, United Kingdom and the United States and its territories) (Note: Including Australian eVisitor.) Visa not required / ETA for some (1-27) EU citizens, different regime for others Visa on arrival / eVisa for all EU citizens (Note: A few countries do not offer eVisa, only Visa on arrival) Electronic visa application for all EU citizens Visa required for all EU citizens

The EU requires that all Annex II countries and territories provide visa-free access for 90 days or longer to nationals of all Schengen states and other EU countries implementing the common visa rules (Cyprus, but not Ireland). If an Annex II country is found to not provide full reciprocity, the EU may decide to suspend the visa exemption for certain categories or later all nationals of that country.

Since the adoption of this policy, full reciprocity has been achieved with all Annex II countries except the United States, which, as of 2026, requires visas from nationals of Bulgaria, Cyprus and Romania. In November 2014, the Bulgarian government announced that it would not ratify the Transatlantic Trade and Investment Partnership unless the United States lifted visa requirements for its nationals. Since the United States failed to lift the requirements, on 3 March 2017 the European Parliament approved a non-binding resolution calling on the European Commission to revoke the visa-free travel for US nationals to the Schengen Area.

Some Annex II countries and territories also impose minor restrictions on nationals of certain or all EU/Schengen states that are not considered a breach of reciprocity by the EU. Australia, Canada, Israel, New Zealand, Saint Kitts and Nevis, Seychelles, South Korea, the United Kingdom and the United States require an electronic authorisation before travel, similar to the EU's own planned ETIAS. As of 2025, approval rates for the Australian electronic authorisation eVisitor were lower than 91% for nationals of Croatia and Lithuania, and lower than 77% for nationals of Romania. Canada requires a visa from nationals of Romania with non-electronic passports. Israel requires nationals of Germany born before 1928 to apply for a visa, which is issued free of charge if they were not involved with the Nazi Party. Montserrat requires an electronic visa from nationals of Croatia. Niue requires visas from nationals of Bulgaria, Croatia, Czech Republic, Estonia, Hungary, Latvia, Lithuania, Poland, Slovakia, Slovenia, and Romania. Nicaragua reimposed a visa requirement for nationals of Iceland and Liechtenstein in February 2026.

== Stays exceeding 90 days ==
In general, third-country nationals staying more than 90 days in the Schengen Area as a whole or in Cyprus require either a long-stay visa for less than a year or a residence permit for longer periods.

Although long-stay visas issued by these countries have a uniform design, the procedures and conditions for issuing them are usually determined by each individual country. For example, some Schengen countries require applications for long-stay visas to be made in the applicant's home country, while other Schengen countries permit them after arrival. Some procedures may vary depending on the applicant's country as well. In some situations, such as for study, the procedures and conditions for long-stay visas have been harmonised among all issuing states. Each country is also free to establish its own conditions for residence permits.

Third-country nationals who are long-term residents of an EU or Schengen state (except Ireland and Denmark) may also acquire the right to move to and settle in another of these states without losing their legal status and social benefits. The Van Der Elst visa rule allows third-country nationals employed in the EU single market to work temporarily in another EU single market country for the same employer under certain conditions.

=== Bilateral visa waivers ===
Some third-country nationals are permitted to stay in the Schengen Area for more than 90 days without the need to apply for a long-stay visa. For example, France does not require nationals of the European microstates to apply for a long-stay visa.

Nationals of some 'Annex II' countries (such as Australia, Canada, Malaysia, New Zealand, Singapore and the United States) that had entered into visa waiver agreements with individual Schengen states before they implemented the Schengen agreement are permitted to stay for an additional period of time, above and beyond the typical maximum stay limit of 90 days within 180 days imposed on visa-free 'Annex II' nationals. In such instances, the period of additional stay depends on the specific visa waiver agreement, and only applies if the 'Annex II' national has used up their maximum stay limit as provided for under the Schengen Area.

Legacy visa waiver agreements for Annex II nationals
Australian and New Zealand citizens enjoy a more liberal visa policy, with both governments having signed bilateral visa agreements with individual Schengen countries. Australian citizens can spend up to 90 days in each of Austria, Belgium, Denmark, Finland, France, Germany, Iceland, Italy, Luxembourg, The Netherlands, Norway, and Sweden without reference to time spent in other Schengen signatory states. New Zealand citizens can spend up to 90 days in each of Austria, Belgium, Czech Republic, Denmark, Finland, France, Germany, Greece, Iceland, Italy, Luxembourg, The Netherlands, Norway, Portugal, Spain, Sweden and Switzerland (as well as Hungary if visiting it as the final Schengen destination) without reference to time spent in other Schengen signatory states, but if travelling to other Schengen countries the 90 days in any 180-day period time limit applies.

Other passport holders mentioned below also enjoy extended visa-free stays in certain countries, above the framework of the Schengen visa exemption of 90 days in any 180-day period:

Argentine, Chilean, Costa Rican, Israeli, Malaysian, South Korean and Uruguayan nationals are permitted to spend an extra 3 months per 6-month period visa-free in the Czech Republic, regardless of time spent in other Schengen countries. Separately, Singaporean nationals are permitted to spend an additional 30 days visa-free in the Czech Republic. Further, the old method of calculating the length of the visa-free stay (i.e. 3 months within 6 months instead of 90 days in any 180-day period) still applies to nationals of Guatemala, Honduras, Mexico, Panama and Paraguay in the Czech Republic.

Canadian, Chilean, Israeli, Japanese, Malaysian, Singaporean, South Korean and United States nationals are permitted to spend an extra period of 3 months visa-free in Denmark.

Argentine, Costa Rican, Israeli, Japanese, Panamanian, South Korean, United States and Uruguayan nationals are permitted to spend an extra 90 days visa-free in Latvia.

Argentine, Australian, Brazilian, Bruneian, Canadian, Chilean, Costa Rican, El Salvador, Guatemala, Honduran, Israeli, Japanese, Malaysian, Mexican, Nicaraguan, Panamanian, Paraguayan, Singaporean, South Korean, United States, Uruguayan and Venezuelan nationals are permitted to spend an extra period of 3 months visa-free in Norway.

Argentine, Chilean, Costa Rican, Honduran, Israeli, Japanese, Malaysian, Mexican, Nicaraguan, Panamanian, Singaporean, South Korean, United States and Uruguayan nationals are permitted to spend an extra period of 3 months visa-free in Poland.

== Means of subsistence ==
In addition to general requirements, Schengen states also set entry conditions for foreign nationals of countries outside the EU single market called the "reference amounts required for the crossing of the external border fixed by national authorities" regarding means of subsistence during their stay.

Means of subsistence requirements
Country	Reference amount
Belgium	€45 per day for aliens staying with a private individual; €95 per day for aliens staying at a hotel.
Bulgaria	€50 per day; minimum €500 per stay
Croatia	€100 per day; but €50 for aliens possessing a certified guarantee letter, a proof of paid travel arrangements, etc.
Czech Republic	€40 per day up to 30 days
Denmark	DKK 350 per day
Estonia	€130.80 per day
Finland	€30 per day
France	€120 per day if holding no proof of accommodation; €65 per day if staying at a hotel; €32.50 per day if holding proof of accommodation.
Germany	€45 per day in the form of cash, credit cards and cheques but alternatively a letter of guarantee from the host.
Greece	€50 per day; minimum total amount of €300 for a stay of up to 5 days reduced by 50% for minors
Hungary	HUF 10,000 per entry or letter of invitation, confirmation of accommodation or any other credible proof.
Iceland	ISK 8,000 per day + ISK 40,000 per each entry
Italy	€269.60 fixed sum for stays up to 5 days (€212.81 per person for groups of two and more); 6–10 days: €44.93 per day (€26.33); 11–20 days: €51.64 fixed sum + €36.67 per day (€25.82 + €22.21); 20+ days €206.58 fixed sum + €27.89 per day (€118.79 + €17.04).
Latvia	€14 per day or certified invitation letter
Liechtenstein	CHF 100 per day; CHF 30 for students
Lithuania	€40 per day
Luxembourg	€67 per day
Malta	€48 per day
Netherlands	€55 per day
Norway	NOK 500 per day (indicative for those not staying with friends or relatives)
Poland	PLN 300 for stay not exceeding 4 days; PLN 75 per day for stay exceeding 4 days
Portugal	€40 per day + €75 per entry
Romania	€50 per day; minimum €500 per stay
Slovakia	€56 per day (€30 for accommodation, €4 for breakfast, €7.5 for lunch, €7.5 for dinner, €7 for spending) or a certified invitation letter
Slovenia	€70; €35 for minors accompanied by parents
Spain	€900 minimum amount (for stays of up to 9 days); €100 per day in excess of 9 days.
Sweden	SEK 450 per day. Needed proof is a copy of three months of bank statements, or of two years of income tax declaration, if there is no official sponsor with proof of that.
Switzerland	CHF 100 per day; CHF 30 for students
Authorities of Austria and Cyprus decide on a case-by-case basis. The Netherlands exempts visitors from Australia, Canada, Japan, New Zealand, South Korea, United States and Vatican City from holding proof of sufficient funds and return tickets. Romania requires visitors from Moldova, Montenegro, North Macedonia, Russia, Serbia and Ukraine to hold a medical insurance covering the period of stay. Romania also exempts visitors from Australia, Canada, South Korea and the United States from holding proof of sufficient funds and return tickets.

== Visa policies of Ireland and overseas territories ==
Ireland has an independent visa policy. It grants visa-free entry to all Schengen Annex II nationalities, except for Albania, Bosnia and Herzegovina, Colombia, Dominica, Georgia, Honduras, Kosovo, Marshall Islands, Mauritius, Micronesia, Moldova, Montenegro, Nicaragua, North Macedonia, Palau, Peru, Saint Kitts and Nevis, Saint Lucia, Serbia, Timor-Leste, Trinidad and Tobago, and Venezuela. It also grants visa-free entry to some additional countries – Belize, Fiji, Guyana, and Maldives. Visas for Ireland and for the Schengen Area are not valid for each other. Ireland is part of the Common Travel Area and maintains freedom of movement with the United Kingdom in addition to with EU and Schengen countries.

The British overseas territory of Akrotiri and Dhekelia has open borders with Cyprus and follows the visa policy of the Schengen Area, but requires permits for stays longer than 28 days per 12-month period. These rules were not affected by Brexit.

The British overseas territory of Gibraltar has an open border with Spain and follows the visa policy of the Schengen Area, under an agreement made after Brexit.

Overseas France and the Caribbean part of the Kingdom of the Netherlands have individual visa policies that are mostly aligned with the Schengen Area, with some exceptions and additions.

The Faroe Islands and Greenland have the same list of nationalities exempt from visas as the Schengen Area, and arrivals from the Schengen Area are not subject to border checks. However, Schengen visas are not valid there, so nationalities that are not exempt need separate visas for these territories. These regulations are due to a special agreement under the Nordic Passport Union.

Svalbard is an entirely visa-free zone. Travellers to and from Svalbard must present a passport or national ID card. Travellers who need a visa for the Schengen Area must have such visa if they travel to Svalbard via mainland Norway, and this must be a double-entry visa if they also return from Svalbard via mainland Norway.

== Visa policies of candidate and applicant states ==
EU member states EU candidates: Albania, Bosnia and Herzegovina, Georgia, Moldova, Montenegro, North Macedonia, Serbia, Turkey and Ukraine Recognised by the EU as a potential candidate which has applied for membership: Kosovo (status disputed).

Countries applying to join the European Union are obliged to adopt the EU's visa policy no later than three months before they formally join the Union. Schengen countries give visa-free access to nationals of all EU candidate and applicant states except Turkey. Candidate states Albania, Bosnia and Herzegovina, Moldova, Montenegro and North Macedonia, and applicant state Kosovo maintain similar visa policies as the Schengen Area, with some notable exceptions regarding countries that were added to the Schengen Annex II more recently and additional nationalities not listed in Annex II. Candidate states Georgia, Serbia, Turkey and Ukraine require visas from some nationalities that have always been in Annex II and also maintain visa exemptions for some additional nationalities not in Annex II. Turkey also requires electronic visas from nationals of EU member state Cyprus.

== Validity for other countries ==
Schengen visas that are valid for further travel are accepted as substitute visas for national visas in several other countries.

Validity of Schengen visas for other countries
- Albania – 90 days; must hold a multiple entry C visa or D visa used to enter the Schengen Area at least once.
- Andorra – should hold a multiple entry visa, relaxed checks.
- Antigua and Barbuda – 30 days; US$100 visa waiver fee applies.
- Belarus – 5 days; for nationals of Gambia, Haiti, Honduras, India, Lebanon, Namibia, Samoa and Vietnam only.
- Bosnia and Herzegovina – 30 days; must hold a multiple entry visa.
- Colombia – 90 days; for nationals of Cambodia, China, India, Myanmar, Nicaragua, Taiwan, Thailand and Vietnam only. Schengen visa must be valid for 180 days at the time of entry to Colombia.
- Cyprus – 90 days; must hold a double or multiple entry C visa valid for the period of stay. Not applicable to Azerbaijani and Turkish citizens.
- Dominican Republic – 90 days.
- Dutch Caribbean – Nationals of any country who are not otherwise visa exempted can enter the Caribbean parts of the Kingdom of the Netherlands for a maximum of 90 days provided holding a valid visa or residence permit for a Schengen country.
- El Salvador – 90 days; not applicable to all nationalities.
- Georgia – 90 days within any 180-day period.
- Gibraltar – 90 days within any 180-day period.
- Guatemala – 90 days; not applicable to all nationalities.
- Honduras – 90 days; not applicable to all nationalities.
- Jamaica – 30 days; not applicable to all nationalities.
- Mexico – 180 days.
- Moldova – 90 days within any 180-day period; applicable to nationals of China, Kuwait, and Qatar only.
- Montenegro – 30 days.
- Morocco – certain nationalities can obtain an electronic Moroccan visa if holding a valid Schengen visa.
- Nicaragua – 90 days; not applicable to all nationalities.
- North Macedonia – 15 days; must hold a C visa valid for at least 5 days beyond the period of stay and must be valid for re-entry to any of the Schengen Area member states.
- Oman – certain nationalities can obtain an electronic Omani visa if holding a valid Schengen visa.
- Philippines – 7 days for nationals of China; 14 days for nationals of India.
- Qatar – Non-visa-free nationals can obtain an electronic travel authorization for 30 days if holding a valid Schengen visa.
- São Tomé and Príncipe – 15 days.
- Saudi Arabia – Nationals of most countries can obtain a visa on arrival or electronic Saudi visa provided holding a valid Schengen visa or residence permit for a Schengen country.
- Serbia – 90 days.
- Turkey – certain nationalities can obtain an electronic Turkish visa if holding a valid Schengen visa.

== See also ==
- eu-LISA
- Entry/Exit System
- European Travel Information and Authorisation System
- Common Travel Area
- Central America-4 Border Control Agreement
- Foreign relations of the European Union
- Long-term resident (European Union)
- Trans-Tasman Travel Arrangement
- Visa Information System
- Visa policy of Ireland
- Visa policy of Northern Cyprus
- Visa policies of Overseas France
- Visa policy of the Kingdom of the Netherlands in the Caribbean
- Visa policy of Svalbard
- Visa requirements for European Union citizens
- Visa requirements for Swiss citizens
- Polish cash-for-visa scandal
