= Vander Elst visa =

The Vander Elst visa is a type of visa or work permit available to non-EEA/EFTA citizens employed by and working for a company in an EU/EEA/EFTA country, that allows them to work for that company in another EEA/EFTA member state, subject to meeting certain eligibility conditions.

The name comes from a legal case where the Belgian entrepreneur Raymond Vander Elst appealed his case to the European Court of Justice and won in 1994. He had won a contract in France, but got bureaucratic trouble with his Moroccan employees.

However, it seems to vary how this is implemented, and often non-EEA-citizens need a normal work visa or work permit when working in another member country regardless of employer.

== See also ==
- Visa policy of the Schengen Area (but Vander Elst visas apply also to non-Schengen countries in the EU/EEA)
