= Code of Entry and Residence of Foreigners and of the Right to Asylum =

Legal code in France

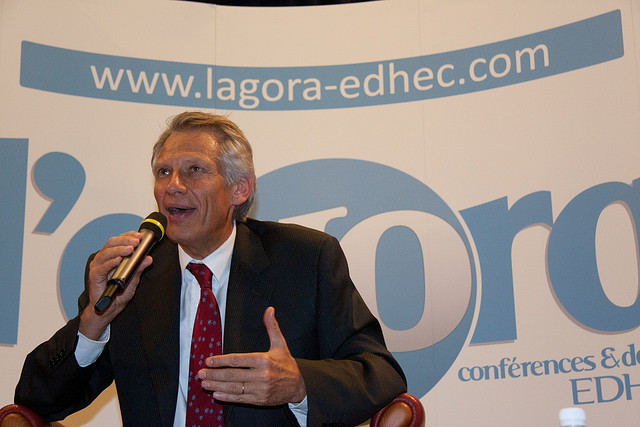
The Code of Foreigners was created at the initiative of Dominique de Villepin, then Minister of the Interior

The Code of Entry and Residence of Foreigners and of the Right to Asylum (French: Code de l'entrée et du séjour des étrangers et du droit d'asile, CESEDA), often simply referred to as the Code of Foreigners (Code des étrangers), is the legal code compiling French laws and regulations related to the rights of foreigners on French soil. It was created on 24 November 2004 by order of Dominique de Villepin, then Minister of the Interior in the government of Prime Minister Jean-Pierre Raffarin.

== History ==
After World War II, French foreigners law was constantly modified. On 2 November 1945 an order set the rules concerning the entry and residence of foreigners on French territory. Between 1993 and 2003, the law was modified every year. This made the law complex and hard to grasp. The codification aimed to resolve legal inconsistencies and to improve coherence.

The code was created by a 24 November 2004 order proposed by Interior Minister Dominique de Villepin. It follows the prescriptions passed on 2 November 1945 concerning the conditions of entry and residence of foreigners, as well as the 25 July 1952 law on the right to asylum. It came into force on 1 March 2005. The regulation was published on 15 November 2006.

== Content ==
The code of entry and residence of foreigner and the right of asylum compiles legal provisions and regulations related to foreigners in France:

- Entry to French territory: conditions of entry, visa, and holding area
- Residency: residence permits, conditions, assisted voluntary return program
- Family reunification
- Removal measures: administrative detention, deportation, expulsion
- Asylum right

== See also ==
- European migrant crisis
- Immigration to France
