= Coordination Directorate for Kosovo and Metohija =

The Coordination Directorate for Kosovo and Metohija (Serbian: Координациона управа за Косово и Метохију, romanized: Koordinaciona uprava za Kosovo i Metohiju) is directorate of Police of Serbia and authority which is responsible for issuing Serbian passports to Serbian citizens residing in Kosovo.

== Schengen Area travel ==
The European Union, while granting visa-free Schengen Area travel, urged Serbia to create a special authority for its Kosovo-residing citizens. This was deemed necessary as Serbia couldn't effectively verify the authenticity of documents needed for passport applications from this group. In 2009, Government of Serbia established the Coordination Directorate for Kosovo and Metohija.

Serbian passports issued by the Coordination Directorate for Kosovo did not allow the holder to enter the Schengen Area without a visa, even for a stay of less than three months within half a year. Holders of these passports had to apply for visas to travel to the European Union in Pristina, Skopje or Tirana, not in Belgrade.

The Council of the European Union removed visa requirements for holders of Serbian passports issued by the Serbian Coordination Directorate on 22 July 2024. The change takes effect 20 days after publication in the Official Journal of the European Union, concluding a process that began with a European Commission proposal in November 2023.
