= National identity document policies =

National policies of documents used to identify a person

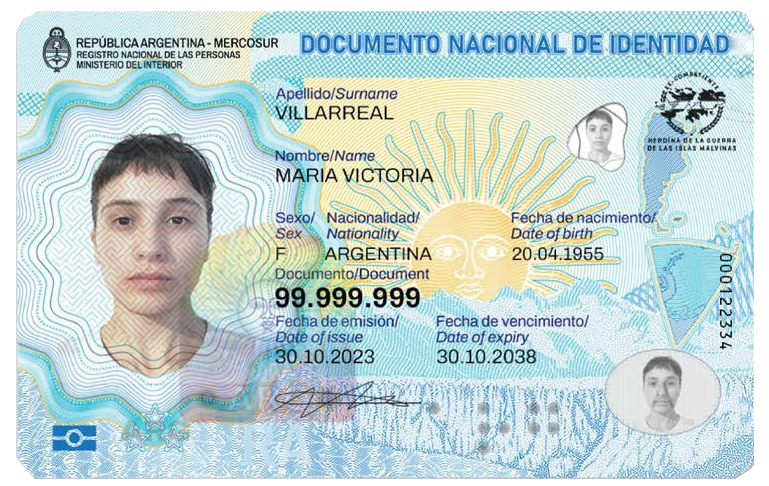
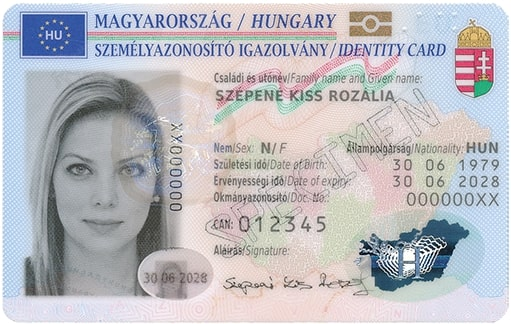
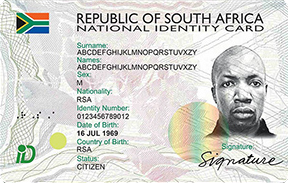
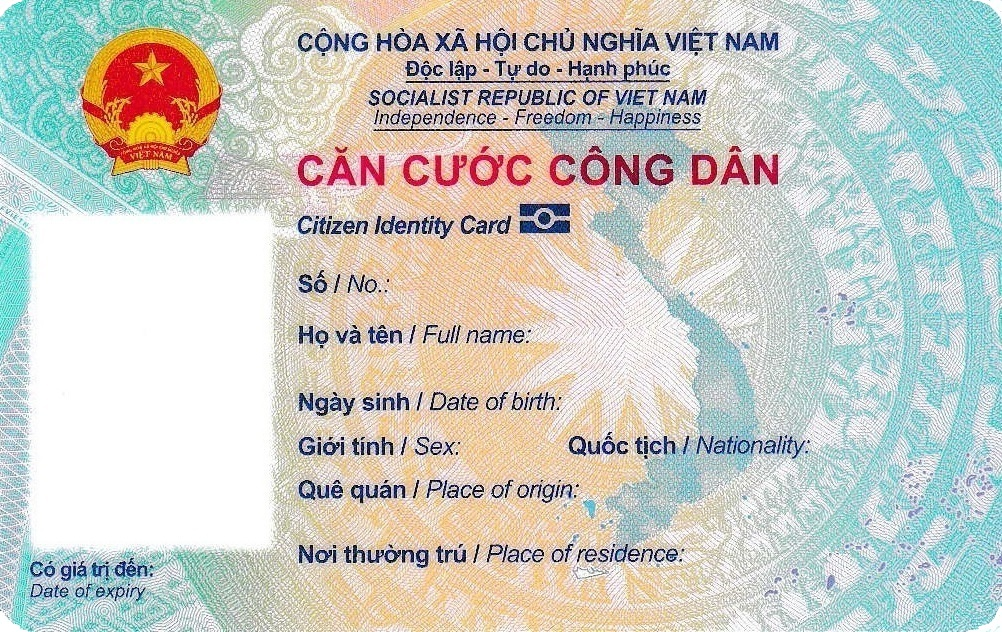
Examples of identity documents (cards) from Argentina, Hungary, South Africa and Vietnam

An identity document (abbreviated as ID) is a document proving a person's identity.

If the identity document is a plastic card it is called an identity card (abbreviated as IC or ID card). When the identity document incorporates a photographic portrait, it is called a photo ID. In some countries, identity documents may be compulsory to have or carry.

The identity document is used to connect a person to information about the person, often in a database. The connection between the identity document and database is based on personal information present on the document, such as the bearer's full name, birth date, address, an identification number, card number, gender, citizenship and more. A unique national identification number is the most secure way, but some countries lack such numbers or do not show them on identity documents.

In the absence of an explicit identity document, other documents such as driver's license may be accepted in many countries for identity verification. Some countries do not accept driver's licenses for identification, often because in those countries they do not expire as documents and can be old or easily forged. Most countries accept passports as a form of identification. Some countries require all people to have an identity document available at all times. Many countries require all foreigners to have a passport or occasionally a national identity card from their home country available at any time if they do not have a residence permit in the country.

== Overview ==
Compulsory ID cards De-facto compulsory ID cards Non-compulsory ID cards ID cards do not exist (any more)

According to Privacy International, as of 1996, possession of identity cards was compulsory in about 100 countries, though what constitutes "compulsory" varies. In some countries, it is compulsory to have an identity card when a person reaches a prescribed age. The penalty for non-possession is usually a fine, but in some cases it may result in detention until identity is established. For people suspected with crimes such as shoplifting or fare evasion, non-possession might result in such detention, also in countries not formally requiring identity cards. In practice, random checks are rare, except in certain situations.

A handful of countries do not issue identity cards. These include Andorra, Australia, the Bahamas, Canada, Nauru, New Zealand, Samoa, Tuvalu and the United Kingdom. Other identity documents such as passports or driver's licenses are then used as identity documents when needed. However, governments of the Bahamas and Samoa are planning to introduce new national identity cards in the near future. Some countries, like Denmark, have more simple official identity cards, which do not match the security and level of acceptance of a national identity card, and which are used by people without driver's licenses.

A number of countries have voluntary identity card schemes. These include Austria, Belize, Finland, France (see France section), Hungary (however, all citizens of Hungary must have at least one of: valid passport, photo-based driving licence, or the National ID card), Iceland, Ireland, Norway, Saint Lucia, Sweden, Switzerland and the United States. The United Kingdom's scheme was scrapped in January 2011 and the database was destroyed.

In the United States, the Federal government issues optional non-obligatory identity cards known as "Passport Cards" (which include important information such as the nationality). On the other hand, states issue optional identity cards for people who do not hold a driver's license as an alternate means of identification. These cards are issued by the same organisation responsible for driver's licenses, usually called the Department of Motor Vehicles. Passport Cards hold limited travel status or provision, usually for domestic travel.

For the Sahrawi people of Western Sahara, pre-1975 Spanish identity cards are the main proof that they were Saharawi citizens as opposed to recent Moroccan settlers. They would thus be allowed to vote in an eventual self-determination referendum.

Companies and government departments may issue ID cards for security purposes, proof of identity, or also as proof of a qualification (without proving identity). For example, all taxicab drivers in the UK carry ID cards. Managers, supervisors, and operatives in construction in the UK can get a photographic ID card, the CSCS (Construction Skills Certification Scheme) card, indicating training and skills including safety training. The card is not an identity card or a legal requirement, but enables holders to prove competence without having to provide all the pertinent documents. Those working on UK railway lands near working lines must carry a photographic ID card to indicate training in track safety (PTS and other cards) possession of which is dependent on periodic and random alcohol and drug screening. In Queensland and Western Australia, anyone working with children has to take a background check and get issued a Blue Card or Working with Children Card, respectively.

== Africa ==
=== Cape Verde ===
Cartão Nacional de Identificação (CNI) is the national identity card of Cape Verde.

=== Egypt ===
It is compulsory for all Egyptian citizens age 16 or older to possess an ID card (Arabic: بطاقة تحقيق شخصية Biṭāqat taḥqīq shakhṣiyya, literally, "Personal Verification Card"). In daily colloquial speech, it is generally simply called "el-biṭāqa" ("the card"). It is used for:

- Opening or closing a bank account
- Registering at a school or university
- Registering the number of a mobile or landline telephone
- Interacting with most government agencies, including:
  - Applying for or renewing a driver's license
  - Applying for a passport
  - Applying for any social services or grants
  - Registering to vote, and voting in elections
  - Registering as a taxpayer

Egyptian ID cards consist of 14 digits, the national identity number, and expire after 7 years from the date of issue. Some feel that Egyptian ID cards are problematic, due to the general poor quality of card holders' photographs and the compulsory requirements for ID card holders to identify their religion and for married women to include their husband's name on their cards.

=== Gambia ===
All Gambian citizens over 18 years of age are required to hold a Gambian National Identity Card. In July 2009, a new biometric identity card was introduced. The biometric card is one of the acceptable documents required to apply for a Gambian Driving Licence.

=== Ghana ===
Ghana begun the issuing of a national identity card for Ghanaian citizens in 1973. However, the project was discontinued three years later due to problems with logistics and lack of financial support. This was the first time the idea of national identification systems in the form of the Ghana Card arose in the country. Full implementation of the Ghana Cards begun from 2006. According to the National Identification Authority, over 15 million Ghanaians have been registered for the Ghana card by September 2020.

=== Liberia ===
Liberia has begun the issuance process of its national biometric identification card, which citizens and foreign residents will use to open bank accounts and participate in other government services on a daily basis.

More than 4.5 million people are expected to register and obtain ID cards of citizenship or residence in Liberia. The project has already started where NIR (National Identification Registry) is issuing Citizen National ID Cards. The centralized National Biometric Identification System (NBIS) will be integrated with other government ministries. Resident ID Cards and ECOWAS ID Cards will also be issued.

=== Mauritius ===
Mauritius requires all citizens who have reached the age of 18 to apply for a National Identity Card. The National Identity Card is one of the few accepted forms of identification, along with passports. A National Identity Card is needed to apply for a passport for all adults, and all minors must take with them the National Identity Card of a parent(s) when applying for a passport.

=== Mozambique ===
Bilhete de identidade (BI) is the national ID card of Mozambique.

=== Nigeria ===
Nigeria first introduced a national identity card in 2005, but its adoption back then was limited and not widespread. The country is now in the process of introducing a new biometric ID card complete with a SmartCard and other security features. The National Identity Management Commission (NIMC) is the federal government agency responsible for the issuance of these new cards, as well as the management of the new National Identity Database. The Federal Government of Nigeria announced in April 2013 that after the next general election in 2015, all subsequent elections will require that voters will only be eligible to stand for office or vote provided the citizen possesses a NIMC-issued identity card. The Central Bank of Nigeria is also looking into instructing banks to request for a National Identity Number (NIN) for any citizen maintaining an account with any of the banks operating in Nigeria. The proposed kick off date is yet to be determined.

=== South Africa ===
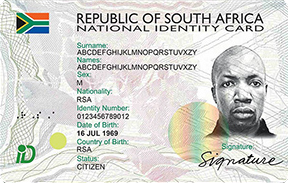
The front of the South African Smart ID

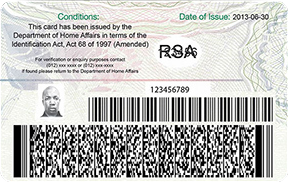
The reverse of the South African Smart ID

South African citizens aged 15 years and 6 months or older are eligible for an ID card. The South African identity document is not valid as a travel document or valid for use outside South Africa. Although carrying the document is not required in daily life, it is necessary to show the document or a certified copy as proof of identity when:

- Signing a contract, including
  - Opening or closing a bank account
  - Registering at a school or university
  - Buying a mobile phone and registering the number
- Interacting with most government agencies, including
  - Applying for or renewing a driving licence or firearm licence
  - Applying for a passport
  - Applying for any social services or grants
  - Registering to vote, and voting in elections
  - Registering as a taxpayer or for unemployment insurance

The South African identity document used to also contain driving and firearms licences; however, these documents are now issued separately in card format. In mid 2013 a smart card ID was launched to replace the ID book. The cards were launched on July 18, 2013, when a number of dignitaries received the first cards at a ceremony in Pretoria. The government plans to have the ID books phased out over a six to eight-year period. The South African government is looking into possibly using this smart card not just as an identification card but also for licences, National Health Insurance, and social grants.

=== Tunisia ===
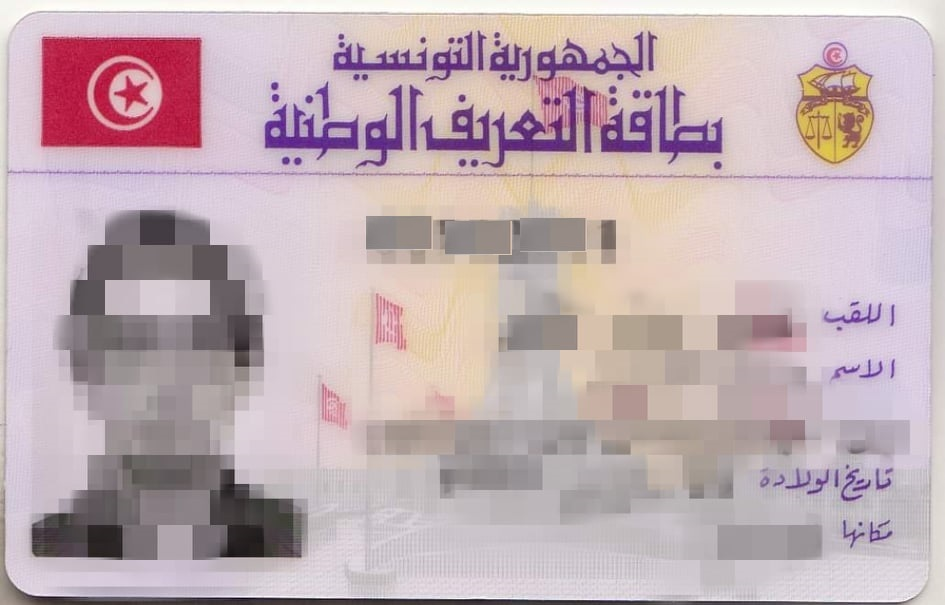
The Tunisian identity card

Every citizen of Tunisia is expected to apply for an ID card by the age of 18; however, with the approval of a parent(s), a Tunisian citizen may apply for, and receive, an ID card prior to their eighteenth birthday upon parental request.

In 2016, The government has introduced a new bill to the parliament to issue new biometric ID documents. The bill has created controversy amid civil society organizations.

=== Zimbabwe ===
Zimbabweans are required to apply for National Registration at the age of 16. Zimbabwean citizens are issued with a plastic card which contains a photograph and their particulars onto it. Before the introduction of the plastic card, the Zimbabwean ID card used to be printed on anodised aluminium. Along with Driving Licences, the National Registration Card (including the old metal type) is universally accepted as proof of identity in Zimbabwe. Zimbabweans are required by law to carry identification on them at all times and visitors to Zimbabwe are expected to carry their passport with them at all times.

== Asia ==
=== Afghanistan ===
Afghan citizens over the age of 18 are required to carry a national ID document called Tazkira.

=== Bahrain ===
Bahraini citizens must have both an ID card, called a "smart card", which is recognized as an official document and can be used within the Gulf Cooperation Council, and a passport, which is recognized worldwide.

=== Bangladesh ===
Biometric identification has existed in Bangladesh since 2008. All Bangladeshis who are 18 years of age and older are included in a central Biometric Database, which is used by the Bangladesh Election Commission to oversee the electoral procedure in Bangladesh. All Bangladeshis are issued with an NID Card which can be used to obtain a passport, Driving Licence, credit card, and to register land ownership.

=== Bhutan ===
The Bhutanese national identity card (called the Buthanese Citizenship card) is an electronic ID card, compulsory for all Bhutanese nationals and costs 100 Bhutanese ngultrum.

=== China ===
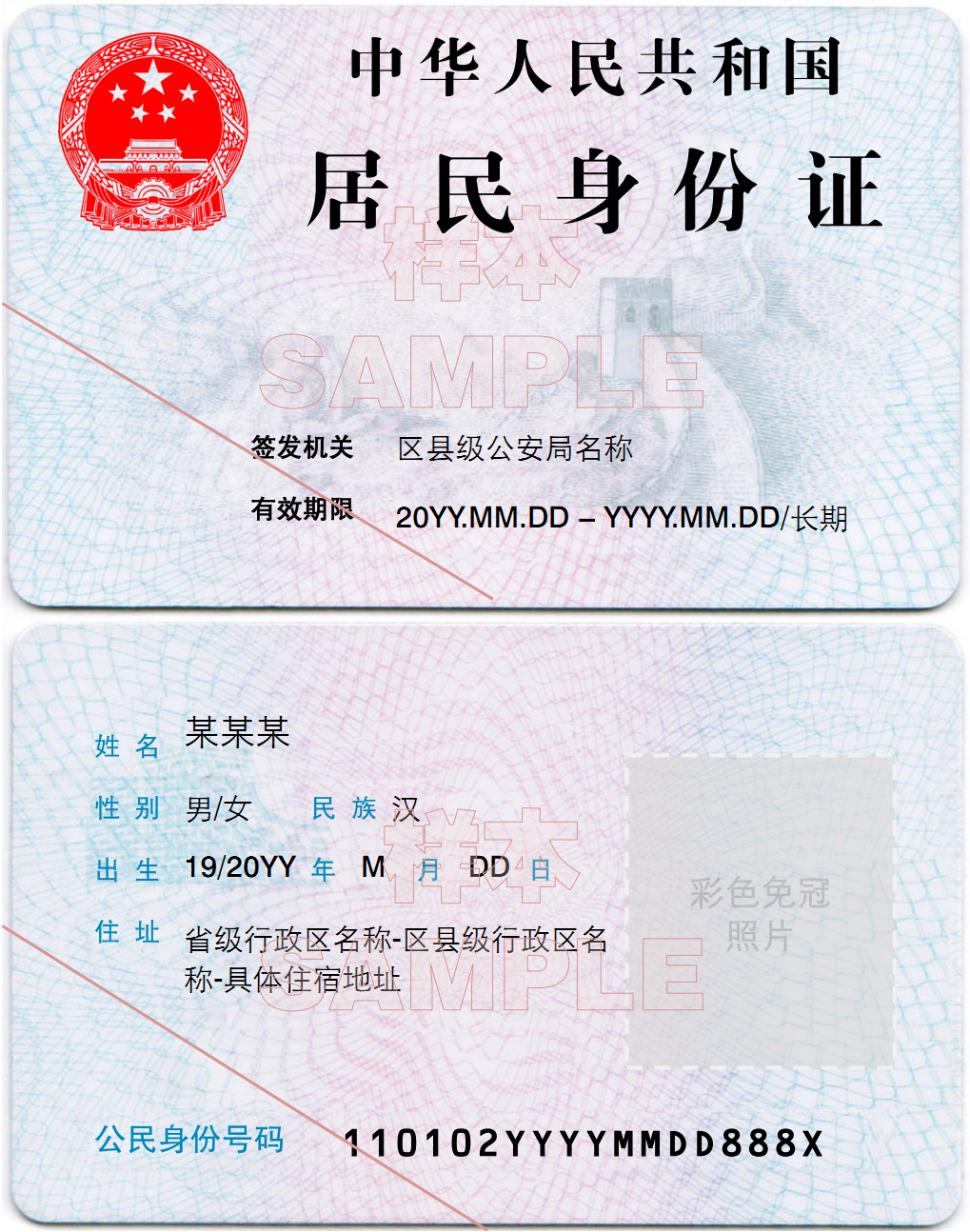
Chinese second-generation ID card

The People's Republic of China requires each of its citizens aged 16 and over to carry an identity card. The card is the only acceptable legal document to obtain employment, a residence permit, driving licence or passport, to open bank accounts or apply for entry to tertiary education and technical colleges, and to gain access to online services, such as TapTap and Bilibili.

=== Hong Kong ===
The Hong Kong Identity Card (or HKID) is an official identity document issued by the Immigration Department of Hong Kong to all people who hold the right of abode, right to land or other forms of limited stay longer than 180 days in Hong Kong. According to Basic Law of Hong Kong, all permanent residents are eligible to obtain the Hong Kong Permanent Identity Card which states that the holder has the right of abode in Hong Kong. All persons aged 16 and above must carry a valid legal government identification document in public. All persons aged 16 and above must be able to produce valid legal government identification documents when requested by legal authorities; otherwise, they may be held in detention to investigate his or her identity and legal right to be in Hong Kong.

=== India ===
While there is no mandatory identity card in India, the Aadhaar card, a multi-purpose national identity card, carrying 16 personal details and a unique identification number, has been available to all citizens since 2009. The card contains a photograph, full name, date of birth, and a unique, randomly generated 12-digit National Identification Number. However, the card itself is rarely required as proof, the number or a copy of the card being sufficient. The card has a SCOSTA QR code embedded on the card, through which all the details on the card are accessible. In addition to Aadhaar, PAN cards, ration cards, voter cards and driving licences are also used. These may be issued by either the government of India or the government of any state and are valid throughout the nation. The Indian passport may also be used.

=== Indonesia ===
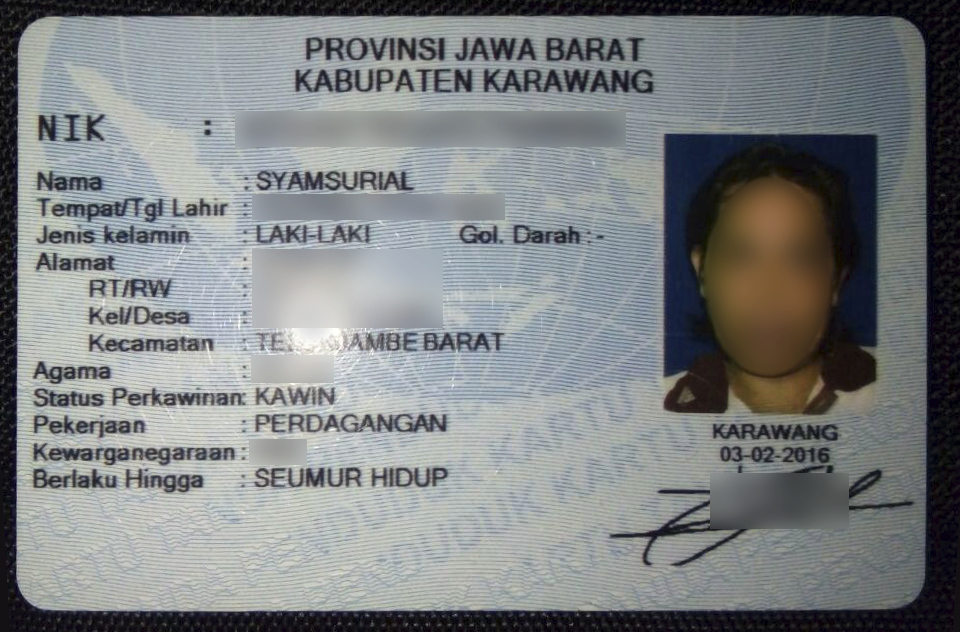
Indonesian national identity card

Residents over 17 are required to hold a KTP (Kartu Tanda Penduduk) identity card. The card will identify whether the holder is an Indonesian citizen or foreign national. In 2011, the Indonesian government started a two-year ID issuance campaign that utilizes smartcard technology and biometric duplication of fingerprint and iris recognition. This card, called the Electronic KTP (e-KTP), will replace the conventional ID card beginning in 2013. By 2013, it is estimated that approximately 172 million Indonesian nationals will have an e-KTP issued to them.

=== Iran ===
Every citizen of Iran has an identification document called Shenasnameh (Iranian identity booklet) in Persian (شناسنامه). This is a booklet based on the citizen's birth certificate which features their Shenasnameh National ID number, given name, surname, their birth date, their birthplace, and the names, birth dates and National ID numbers of their legal ascendants. In other pages of the Shenasnameh, their marriage status, names of spouse(s), names of children, date of every vote cast and eventually their death would be recorded.

Every Iranian permanent resident above the age of 15 must hold a valid National Identity Card (Persian:کارت ملی) or at least obtain their unique National Number from any of the local Vital Records branches of the Iranian Ministry of Interior.

In order to apply for an NID card, the applicant must be at least 15 years old and have a photograph attached to their birth certificate, which is undertaken by the Vital Records branch.

Since June 21, 2008, NID cards have been compulsory for many things in Iran and Iranian missions abroad (e.g., obtaining a passport, driver's license, any banking procedure, etc.).

=== Iraq ===
Every Iraqi citizen must have a National Card (البطاقة الوطنية).

=== Israel ===
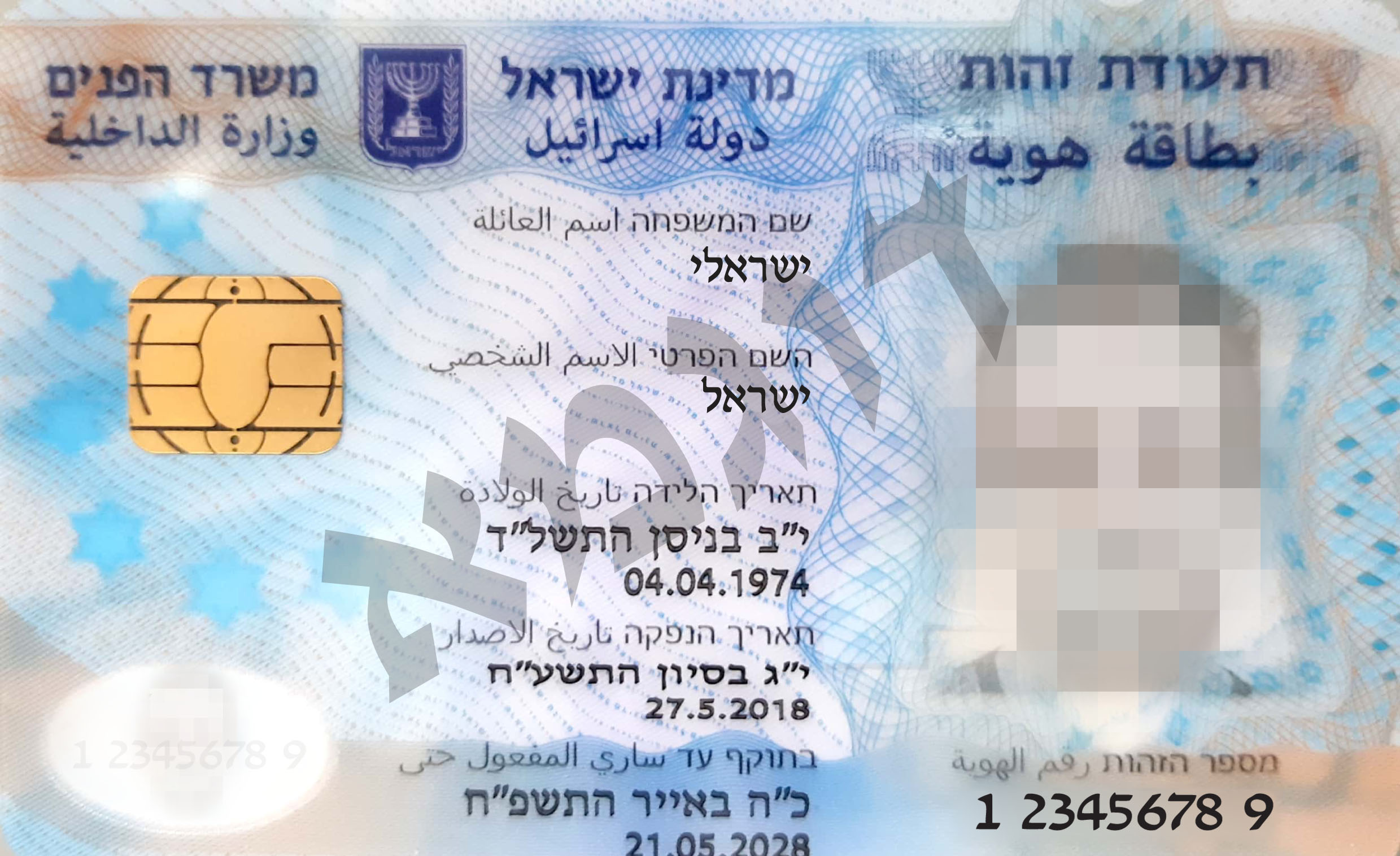
Israeli biometric national identity card

Israeli law requires every permanent resident above the age of 16, whether a citizen or not, to carry an identification card called te'udat zehut (Hebrew: תעודת זהות) in Hebrew or biţāqat huwīya (بطاقة هوية) in Arabic.

The card is designed in a bilingual form, printed in Hebrew and Arabic; however, the personal data is presented in Hebrew by default and may be presented in Arabic as well if the owner decides so. The card must be presented to an official on duty (e.g., a policeman) upon request, but if the resident is unable to do this, one may contact the relevant authority within five days to avoid a penalty.

Until the mid-1990s, the identification card was considered the only legally reliable document for many actions such as voting or opening a bank account. Since then, the new Israeli driver's licenses which include photos and extra personal information are now considered equally reliable for most of these transactions. In other situations, any government-issued photo ID, such as a passport or a military ID, may suffice.

=== Japan ===
Japanese citizens are not required to have identification documents with them within the territory of Japan. When necessary, official documents, such as one's Japanese driver's license, individual number card, basic resident registration card, radio operator license, social insurance card, health insurance card or passport are generally used and accepted. On the other hand, mid- to long-term foreign residents are required to carry their Zairyū cards, while short-term visitors and tourists (those with a Temporary Visitor status sticker in their passport) are required to carry their passports.

=== Kazakhstan ===
Since 1994, Kazakhstan has issued a compulsory identity card (Kazakh: Jeke kuälık), with a validity of 10 years, for all its citizens over the age of 16. In order to receive an ID card, a Kazakh citizen must apply to NJSC State Corporation "Government for Citizens" at their permanent or temporary place of residence.

Currently, there's no legislation in requiring persons in Kazakhstan to carry their ID cards in public. In addition, the ID card documents could be stored digitally in mobile phones due to an eGov app launched in November 2019.

=== Kuwait ===
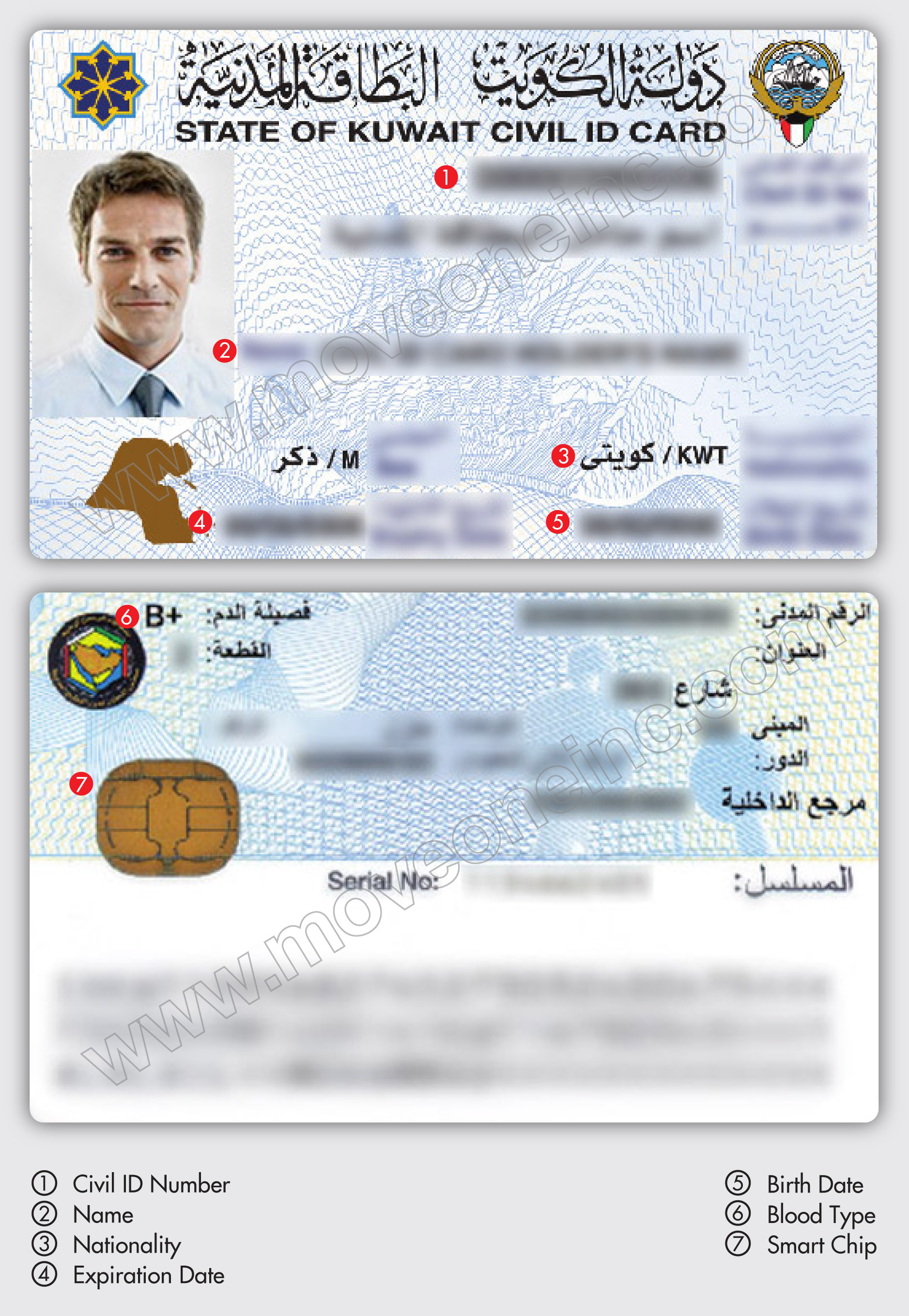
Front and reverse of the Kuwaiti national identity card

The Kuwaiti identity card is issued to Kuwaiti citizens. It can be used as a travel document when visiting countries in the Gulf Cooperation Council.

=== Kyrgyzstan ===
The first post-Soviet Kyrgyz identity document was regulated in a government resolution No. 775 of October 17, 1994 "on the approval of the regulations on the passport system of the Kyrgyz Republic" which included a sample passport and its description. The Kyrgyz passport was to be used both internally, as identity document and externally as a passport. In 2004 a separate document, ID card was introduced in accordance with government resolution No. 55 issued on July 27, 2004.

According to the Resolution of the Government of the Kyrgyz Republic dated November 18, 2016 No. 598, 1994 passports with a mark on the extension of the validity period "indefinitely" from April 1, 2017 completely lost their legal force and were recognized as invalid.

The procedure for issuing and describing the form of the identification card were approved by Resolution No. 197 of the Government of Kyrgyzstan issued on April 3, 2017. In 2017 a new model of ID card entered into use.

=== Macau ===
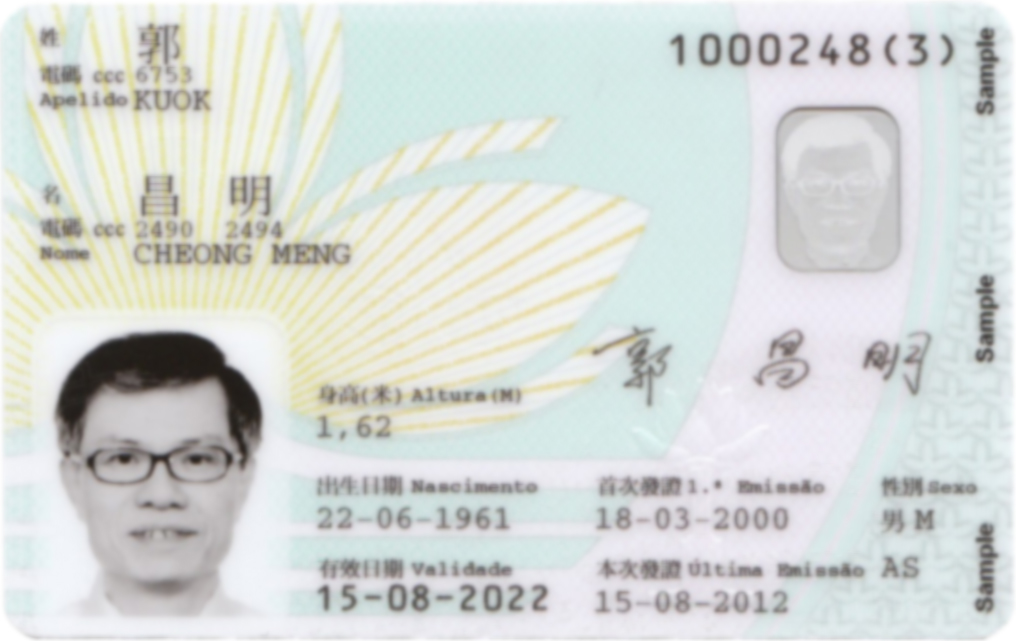
Front of the Macau identity card

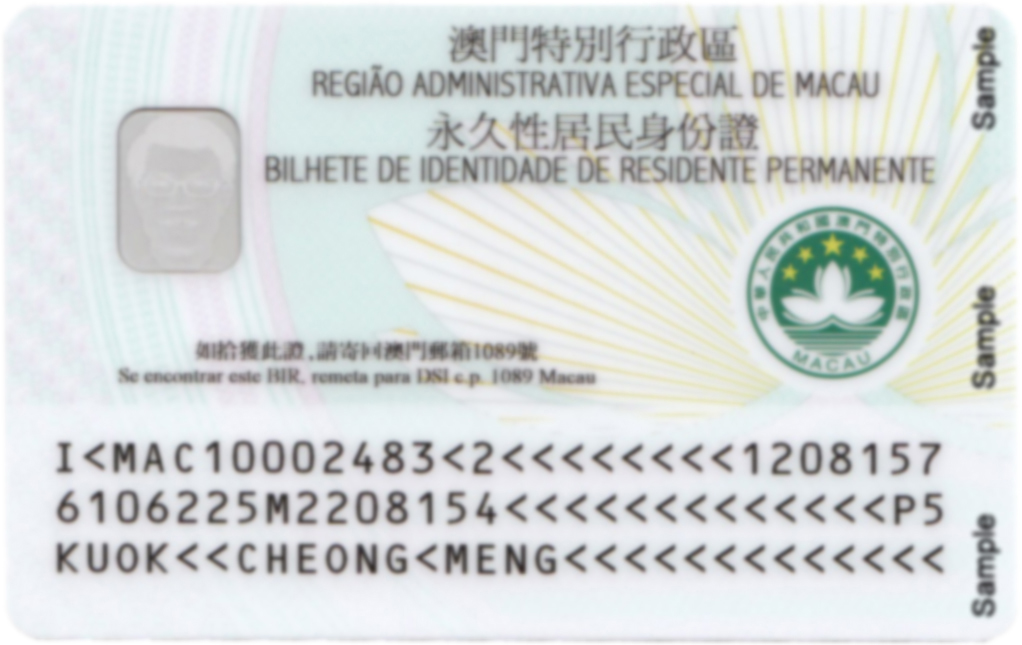
Reverse of the Macau identity card

The Macau Resident Identity Card is an official identity document issued by the Identification Department to permanent residents and non-permanent residents.

=== Malaysia ===
In Malaysia, the MyKad is the compulsory identity document for Malaysian citizens aged 12 and above. Introduced by the National Registration Department of Malaysia on September 5, 2001, as one of four MSC Malaysia flagship applications and a replacement for the High Quality Identity Card (Kad Pengenalan Bermutu Tinggi), Malaysia became the first country in the world to use an identification card that incorporates both photo identification and fingerprint biometric data on an in-built computer chip embedded in a piece of plastic.

=== Myanmar ===
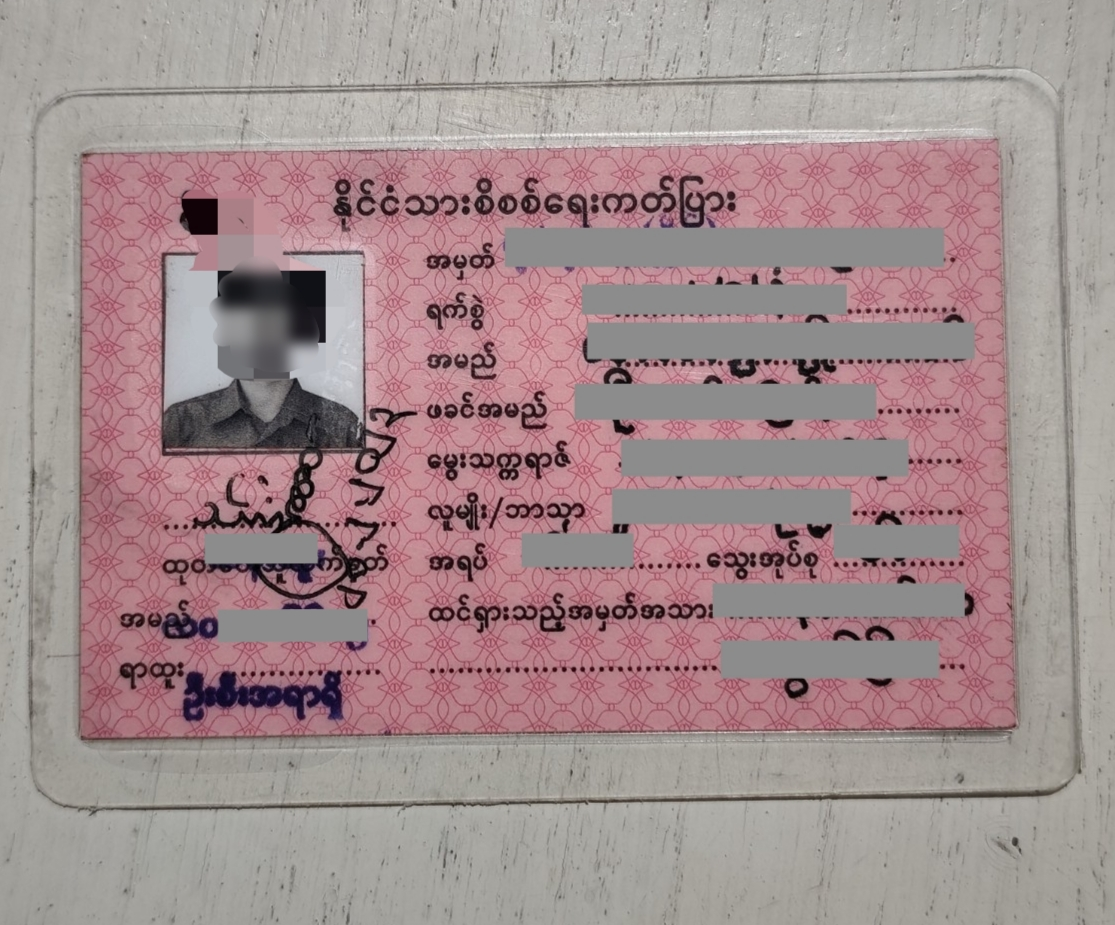
Myanmar Citizenship scrutiny card

Myanmar citizens are required to obtain a National Registration Card (NRC), while non-citizens are given a Foreign Registration Card (FRC).

=== Nepal ===
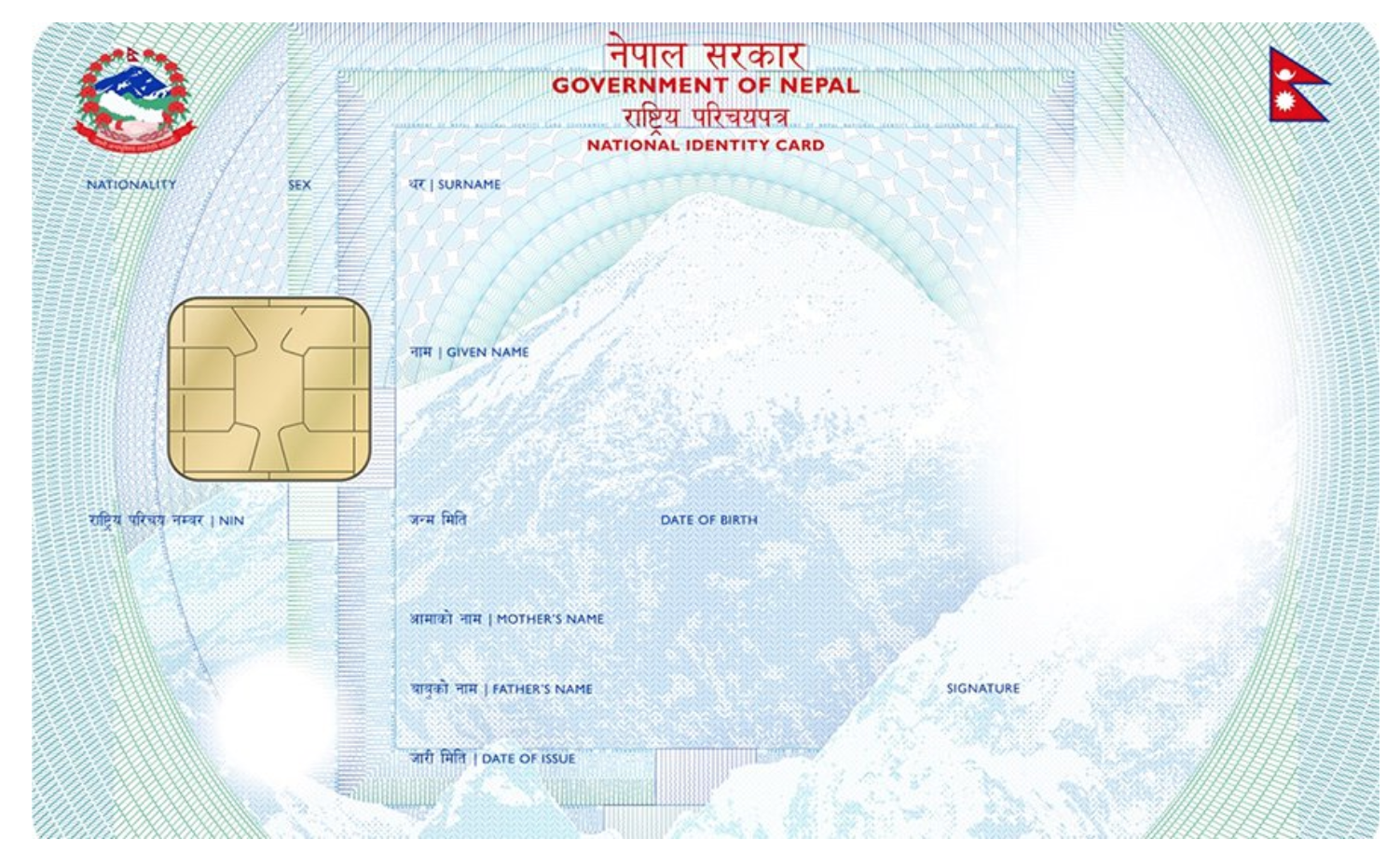
Biometric Nepalese identity card

New biometric cards rolled out in 2018. Information displayed in both English and Nepali.

=== Pakistan ===
In Pakistan, all adult citizens must register for the Computerized National Identity Card (CNIC), with a unique number, at age 18. CNIC serves as an identification document to authenticate an individual's identity as a citizen of Pakistan.

Earlier on, National Identity Cards (NICs) were issued to citizens of Pakistan. Now, the government has shifted all its existing records of National Identity Cards (NIC) to the central computerized database managed by NADRA. New CNIC's are machine readable and have security features such as facial and fingerprint information. At the end of 2013, smart national identity cards, SNICs, were also made available.

=== Palestine ===
The Palestinian Authority issues identification cards following agreements with Israel. Since 1995, in accordance to the Oslo Accords, the data is forwarded to Israeli databases and verified. In February 2014, a presidential decision issued by Palestinian president Mahmoud Abbas to abolish the religion field was announced. Israel has objected to abolishing religion on Palestinian IDs because it controls their official records, IDs and passports and the PA does not have the right to make amendments to this effect without the prior approval of Israel. The Palestinian Authority in Ramallah said that abolishing religion on the ID has been at the center of negotiations with Israel since 1995. The decision was criticized by Hamas officials in Gaza Strip, saying it is unconstitutional and will not be implemented in Gaza because it undermines the Palestinian cause.

=== Philippines ===
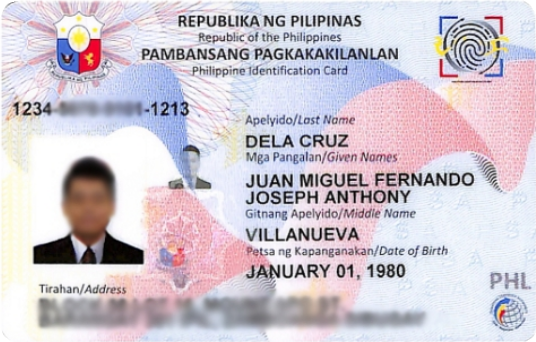
Philippine identity card

The Philippine Identification System (PhilSys) ID card began to be issued in August 2018 to Filipino citizens and foreign residents aged 18 and above as part of a national registry, and is available in card, paper, and digital formats, all of which are considered valid and equivalent. Registration is compulsory, however possession of the card itself is not. It should harmonize existing government-initiated identification cards that have been issued – including the Unified Multi-Purpose ID issued to members of the Social Security System, Government Service Insurance System, Philippine Health Insurance Corporation and the Home Development Mutual Fund (Pag-IBIG Fund).

=== Singapore ===
In Singapore, every citizen, and permanent resident (PR) must register at the age of 15 for an Identity Card (IC). The card is necessary not only for procedures of state but also in the day-to-day transactions such as registering for a mobile phone line, obtaining certain discounts at stores, and logging on to certain websites on the internet. Schools frequently use it to identify students, both online and in exams.

=== South Korea ===
Every citizen of South Korea over the age of 17 is issued an ID card called Jumindeungrokjeung (주민등록증). It has had several changes in its history, the most recent form being a plastic card meeting the ISO 7810 standard. The card has the holder's photo and a 15-digit ID number calculated from the holder's birthday and birthplace. A hologram is applied for the purpose of hampering forgery. This card has no additional features used to identify the holder, save the photo. Other than this card, the South Korean government accepts a Korean driver's license card, an Alien Registration Card, a passport and a public officer ID card as an official ID card.

=== Sri Lanka ===
The E-National Identity Card (abbreviation: E-NIC) is the identity document in use in Sri Lanka. It is compulsory for all Sri Lankan citizens who are sixteen years of age and older to have a NIC. NICs are issued from the Department for Registration of Persons. The Registration of Persons Act No.32 of 1968 as amended by Act Nos 28 and 37 of 1971 and Act No.11 of 1981 legislates the issuance and usage of NICs.

Sri Lanka is in the process of developing a Smart Card based RFID NIC card which will replace the obsolete 'laminated type' cards by storing the holders information on a chip that can be read by banks, offices, etc., thereby reducing the need to have documentation of these data physically by storing in the cloud.

The NIC number is used for unique personal identification, similar to the social security number in the US.

In Sri Lanka, all citizens over the age of 16 need to apply for a National Identity Card (NIC). Each NIC has a unique 10-digit number, in the format 000000000A (where 0 is a digit and A is a letter). The first two digits of the number are your year of birth (e.g.: 93xxxxxxxx for someone born in 1993). The final letter is generally a 'V' or 'X'. An NIC number is required to apply for a passport (over 16), driving license (over 18) and to vote (over 18). In addition, all citizens are required to carry their NIC on them at all times as proof of identity, given the security situation in the country. NICs are not issued to non-citizens, who are still required to carry a form of photo identification (such as a photocopy of their passport or foreign driving license) at all times. At times the Postal ID card may also be used.

=== Taiwan ===
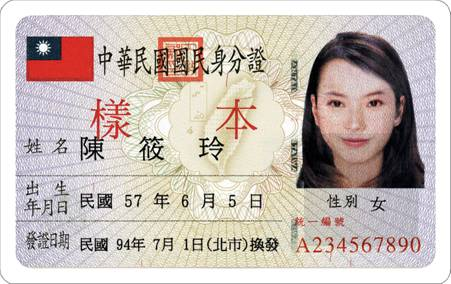
ID card issued in Taiwan

The "National Identification Card" (Chinese: 國民身分證) is issued to all nationals of the Republic of China (Official name of Taiwan) aged 14 and older who have household registration in the Taiwan area. The Identification Card is used for virtually all activities that require identity verification within Taiwan such as opening bank accounts, renting apartments, employment applications and voting.

The Identification Card contains the holder's photo, ID number, Chinese name, and (Minguo calendar) date of birth. The back of the card also contains the person's registered address where official correspondence is sent, place of birth, and the name of legal ascendants and spouse (if any).

If residents move, they must re-register at a municipal office (Chinese: 戶政事務所).

ROC nationals with household registration in Taiwan are known as "registered nationals". ROC nationals who do not have household registration in Taiwan (known as "unregistered nationals") do not qualify for the Identification Card and its associated privileges (e.g., the right to vote and the right of abode in Taiwan), but qualify for the Republic of China passport, which unlike the Identification Card, is not indicative of residency rights in Taiwan. If such "unregistered nationals" are residents of Taiwan, they will hold a Taiwan Area Resident Certificate as an identity document, which is nearly identical to the Alien Resident Certificate issued to foreign nationals/citizens residing in Taiwan.

=== Tajikistan ===
In 1994, the first post-Soviet Tajik internal passport appeared, which was filled in manually. Neither the number nor the series of the document were printed on the inner pages, and the owner's photo was easy to re-stick. This document turned out to be the most convenient for falsification, hence such passports were in great demand among citizens of neighbouring countries hiding from justice.

=== Thailand ===
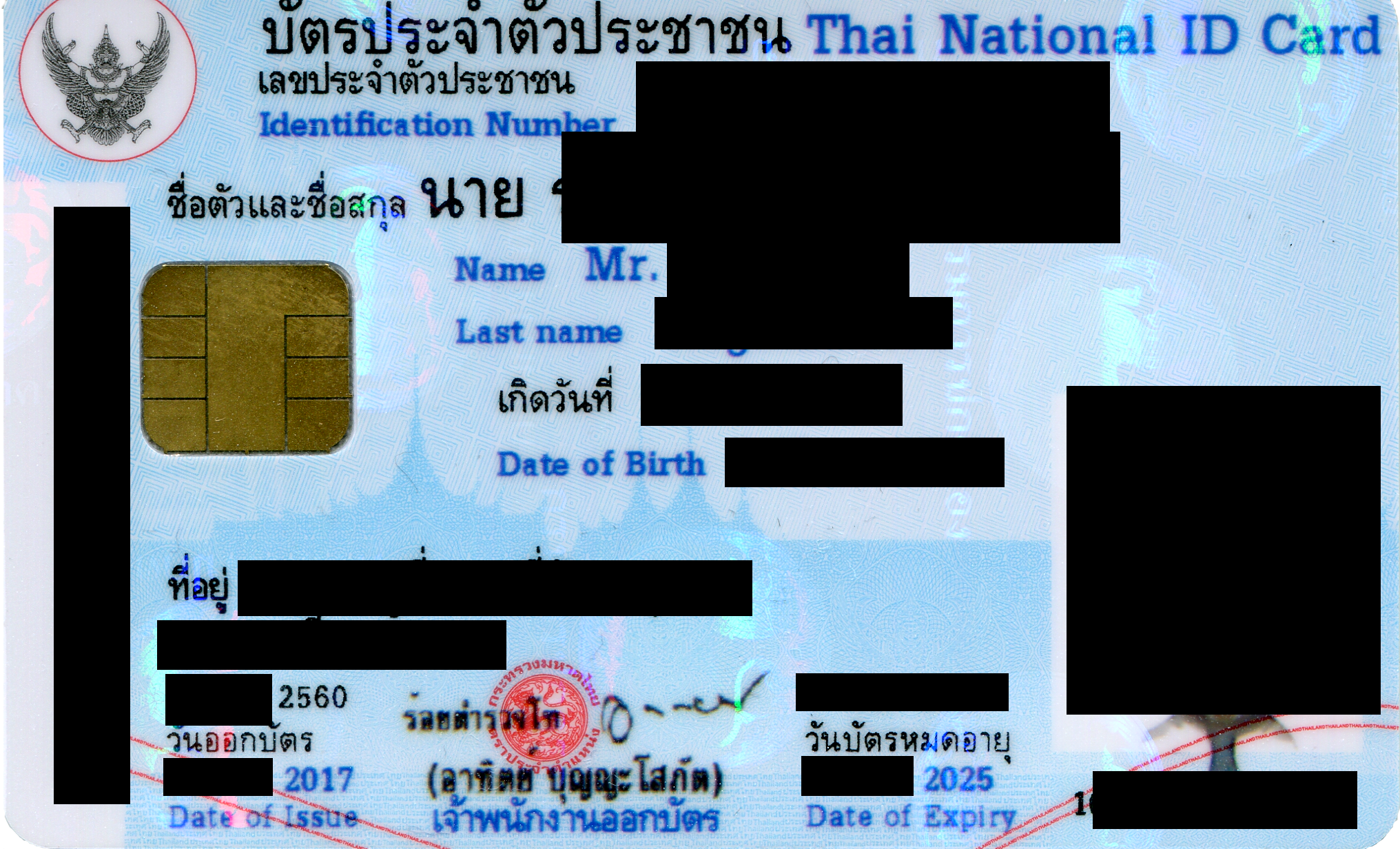
Thai national identity card

In Thailand, the Thai National ID Card (Thai: บัตรประจำตัวประชาชน; RTGS: bat pracham tua pracha chon) is an official identity document issued only to Thai Nationals. The card proves the holder's identity for receiving government services and other entitlements.

=== Turkey ===
The Turkish national ID card (Turkish: Nüfus Cüzdanı) is compulsory for all Turkish citizens from birth. Cards for males and females have a different color. The front shows the first and last name of the holder, first name of legal ascendants, birth date and place, and an 11 digit ID number. The back shows marital status, religious affiliation, the region of the county of origin, and the date of issue of the card. On February 2, 2010, the European Court of Human Rights ruled in a 6 to 1 vote that the religious affiliation section of the Turkish identity card violated articles 6, 9, and 12 of the European Convention of Human Rights, to which Turkey is a signatory. The ruling should coerce the Turkish government to completely omit religious affiliation on future identity cards. The Turkish police are allowed to ask any person to show ID, and refusing to comply may lead to arrest. It can be used for international travel to Northern Cyprus, Georgia and Ukraine instead of a passport.

Ministry of Interior of Turkey released EU-like identity cards for all Turkish citizens in 2017. New identity cards are fully biometric and can be used as a bank card, bus ticket or at international trips.

=== Turkmenistan ===
Following the dissolution of the Soviet Union and the establishment of independent Turkmenistan, blank passports of citizens of the USSR of the 1974 model and foreign passports of citizens of the USSR were used in Turkmenistan both as internal identity document and passport, in which the stamp “Citizen of Turkmenistan” was placed. The unified national passport system was introduced in Turkmenistan on October 25, 1996 by the Decree of the President "On Approval of the Regulations on the Passport System in Turkmenistan". According to the approved regulations, the exchange and issuance of national passports of a citizen of Turkmenistan was to be carried out in the period from October 25, 1996 to December 31, 2001. The new document kept its dual-purpose role as internal identity document and passport. Following the introduction of a Turkmen biometric passport in July 2008 to be used as travel document, a separate internal passport was issued. Each Turkmen identity document contains a code based on the region it was issed at.

Region code	Region
AS	Ashgabat
AH	Ahal Region
BN	Balkan Region
LB	Lebap Region
MR	Mary Region
DZ	Daşoguz Region

=== United Arab Emirates ===
The Federal Authority For Identity and Citizenship is a government agency that is responsible for issuing the National Identity Cards for the citizens (UAE nationals), GCC (Gulf Corporation Council) nationals and residents in the country. All individuals are mandated to apply for the ID card at all ages. For individuals of 15 years and above, fingerprint biometrics (10 fingerprints, palm, and writer) are captured in the registration process. Each person has a unique 15-digit identification number (IDN) that a person holds throughout his/her life.

The Identity Card is a smart card that has a state-of-art technology in the smart cards field with very high security features which make it difficult to duplicate. It is a 144KB Combi Smart Card, where the electronic chip includes personal information, 2 fingerprints, 4-digit pin code, digital signature, and certificates (digital and encryption). Personal photo, IDN, name, date of birth, signature, nationality, and the ID card expiry date are fields visible on the physical card.

In the UAE it is used as an official identification document for all individuals to benefit from services in the government, some of the non-government, and private entities in the UAE. This supports the UAE's vision of smart government as the ID card is used to securely access e-services in the country. The ID card could also be used by citizens as an official travel document between GCC countries instead of using passports. The implementation of the national ID program in the UAE enhanced security of the individuals by protecting their identities and preventing identity theft.

=== Uzbekistan ===
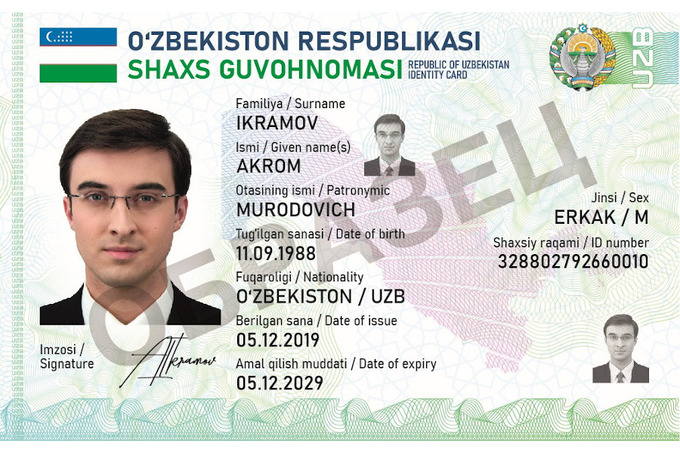
Uzbek identity card

Following the dissolution of the Soviet Union, Uzbek passport was also used as an internal identity document. In September 2020, President of Uzbekistan Shavkat Mirziyoyev signed a decree "On measures to introduce ID cards in the Republic of Uzbekistan", which called for the introcdution of a new identification document effective January 1, 2021 to eventually replaced by a biometric passport with integrated circuit (chip) by 2030. This will also allow citizens to use government services. From January 1, 2023 to December 31, 2030, the exchange of expired ID cards for biometric passports is mandatory as they expire.

=== Vietnam ===
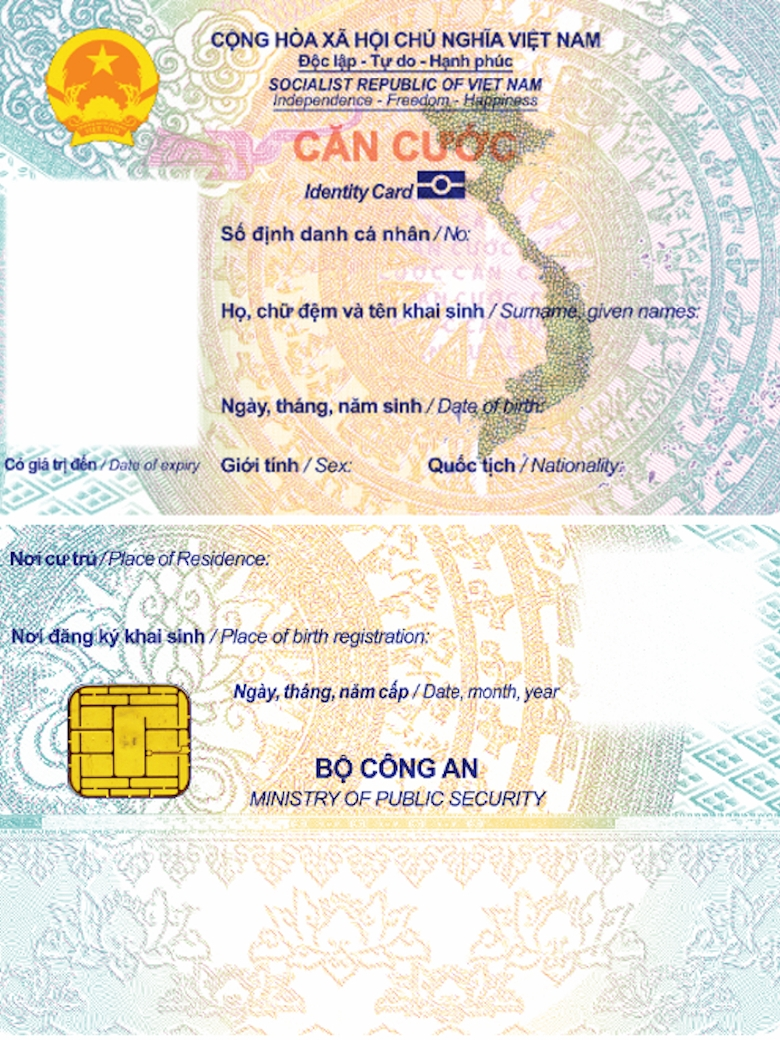
Obverse and reverse sides of an older version of the Vietnamese biometric national identity card

In Vietnam, all citizens above 14 years old must possess an Identity card provided by the local authority, and must be reissued when the citizens' years of age reach 25, 40 and 60. Children from 6 to under 14 years old can request if needed. Formerly a people's ID document was used.

== Europe ==
=== European Union, European Economic Area and European Free Trade Association ===
National identity cards issued to the citizens of the European Union and European Free Trade Association (Iceland, Liechtenstein, Norway, and Switzerland) that state the bearer's citizenship as belonging to an EU/EFTA member can be used as identity documents within the home country, and as travel documents to exercise the right of free movement in the EU or EFTA.

During the UK Presidency of the EU in 2005 a decision was made to: "Agree common standards for security features and secure issuing procedures for ID cards (December 2005), with detailed standards agreed as soon as possible thereafter. In this respect, the UK Presidency put forward a proposal for the EU-wide use of biometrics in national identity cards".

From August 2, 2021, the European identity card is intended to replace and standardize the various identity card styles currently in use. (Note: The legal acquis has been identified as EEA-relevant by the EU Commission, which makes it under scrutiny for incorporation into the EEA Agreement by Iceland, Liechtenstein and Norway. However, the legal basis rely on Article 21 of the Treaty on the Functioning of the European Union, an article which is not reflected in the EEA Agreement.)

==== Austria ====
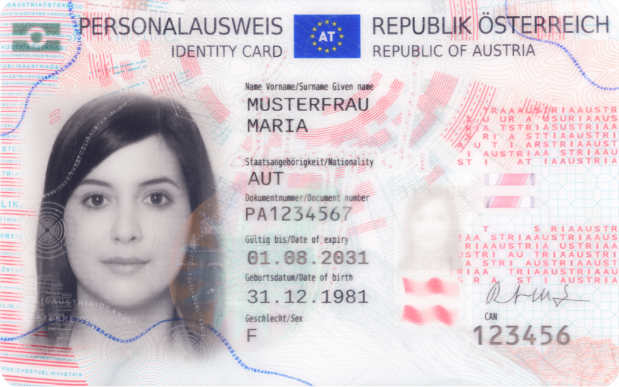
Austrian identity card

The Austrian identity card is issued to Austrian citizens. It can be used as a travel document when visiting countries in the EU/EFTA, Albania, Andorra, Bosnia and Herzegovina, Georgia, Kosovo, Moldova, Monaco, Montenegro, North Macedonia, San Marino, Serbia, Vatican City, the French overseas territories and the British Crown Possessions, as well as on organized tours to Jordan (through Aqaba airport) and Tunisia. Only around 10% of the citizens of Austria had this card in 2012, as they can use the Austrian driver's licenses or other identity cards domestically and the more widely accepted Austrian passport abroad.

==== Belgium ====
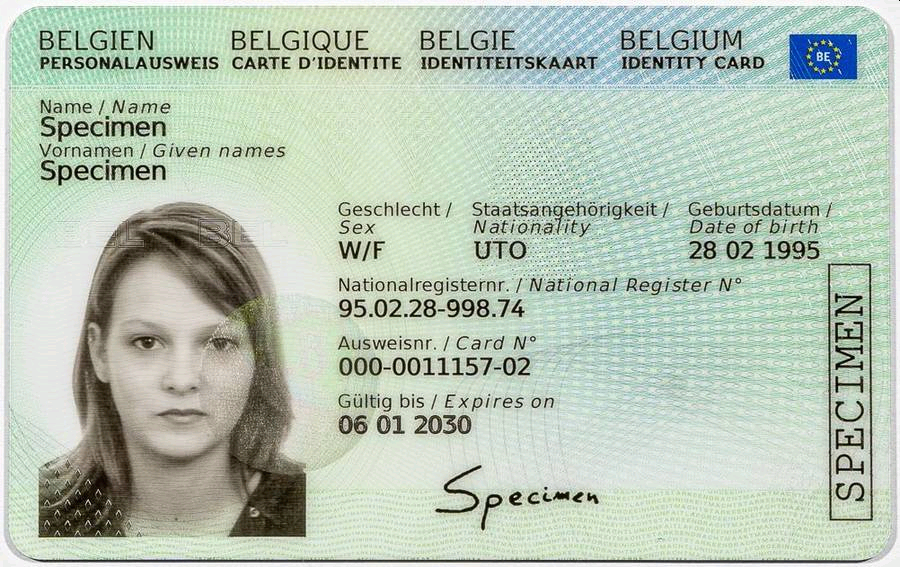
Belgian national identity card

In Belgium, everyone above the age of 12 is issued an identity card (carte d'identité in French, identiteitskaart in Dutch and Personalausweis in German), and from the age of 15 carrying this card at all times is mandatory. For foreigners residing in Belgium, similar cards (foreigner's cards, vreemdelingenkaart in Dutch, carte pour étrangers in French) are issued, although they may also carry a passport, a work permit, or a (temporary) residence permit.

Since 2000, all newly issued Belgian identity cards have a chip (eID card), and roll-out of these cards is expected to be complete in the course of 2009. Since 2008, the aforementioned foreigner's card has also been replaced by an eID card, containing a similar chip. The eID cards can be used both in the public and private sector for identification and for the creation of legally binding electronic signatures.

Until end 2010 Belgian consulates issued old style ID cards (105 x 75 mm) to Belgian citizens who were permanently residing in their jurisdiction and who chose to be registered at the consulate (which is strongly advised). Since 2011 Belgian consulates issue electronic ID cards, the electronic chip on which is not activated however.

==== Bulgaria ====
In Bulgaria, it is obligatory to possess an identity card (Bulgarian – лична карта, lichna karta) at the age of 14 and above. Any person above 14 being checked by the police without carrying at least some form of identification is liable to a fine of 50 Bulgarian levs (about €25).

==== Croatia ====
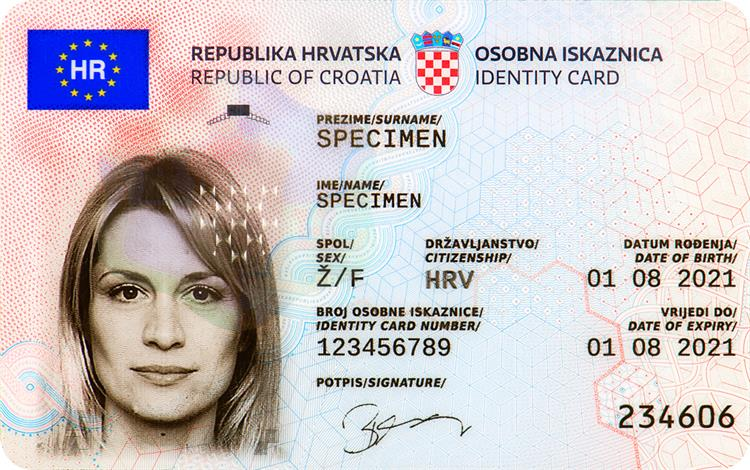
Croatian ID card specimen

All Croatian citizens may request an Identity Card, called Osobna iskaznica (literally Personal card). All persons over the age of 18 must have an Identity Card and carry it at all times. Refusal to carry or produce an Identity Card to a police officer can lead to a fine of 100 kuna or more and detention until the individual's identity can be verified by fingerprints.

The Croatian ID card is valid in the entire European Union, and can also be used to travel throughout the non-EU countries of the Balkans.

The 2013 design of the Croatian ID card is prepared for future installation of an electronic identity card chip, which is set for implementation in 2014.

==== Cyprus ====
The acquisition and possession of a Civil Identity Card is compulsory for any eligible person who has reached twelve years of age. On January 29, 2015, it was announced that all future IDs to be issued will be biometric. They can be applied for at Citizen Service Centres (KEP) or at consulates with biometric data capturing facilities.

An ID card costs €30 for adults and €20 for children with 10/5 years validity respectively. It is a valid travel document for the entire European Union.

==== Czech Republic ====
In Czech, an ID is called Občanský průkaz, an identity card with a photo is issued to all citizens of the Czech Republic at the age of 15. It is officially recognised by all member states of the European Union for intra EU travel. Travelling outside the EU mostly requires the Czech passport.

==== Denmark ====
Denmark is the only EU/EEA country that does not issue EU standard national identity cards or travel documents in a card format.

The most common identity documents in Denmark are driving licences and passports, containing both the personal identification number and a photo. Identity documents are not mandatory in Denmark.

For those who do not have a passport or driving licence, Danish identification cards (Danish: legitimationskort) are issued by municipalities. Each municipality has their own design and they are not accepted as valid travel documents outside Denmark. They were launched in 2017, replacing previous "Youth Cards". Since 2018, information about the nationality of the cardholder has been included which briefly allowed the card to be used for travel to Sweden. However in September 2019, Swedish authorities explicitly banned Danish municipal identity cards from being used for entry for security reasons. In 2021, the Danish Ministry of Interior came to the conclusion that more secure ID cards were not on the agenda due to prohibitive costs.

Previously, Personal identification number certificates (Danish:Personnummerbevis) were optionally issued in Denmark but have been largely replaced by National Health Insurance Card (Danish:Sundhedskortet) which contains the same information and health insurance information. The National Health Insurance Card is issued to all health insured residents in Denmark. It was commonly used as a de facto identity document despite the fact it has no photo of the holder. Until 2004, the national debit card Dankort contained a photo of the holder and was widely accepted as identification until Danish banks lobbied successfully to have pictures removed from debit cards. Between 2004 and 2016, municipalities issued a "photo identity card" or "youth cards" (Danish: billedlegitimationskort), but it was limited to proof of age verification.

==== Estonia ====
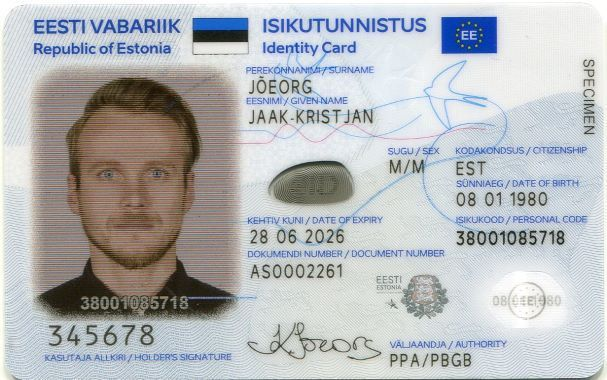
Estonian identity document in 2021

The Estonian identity card (Estonian: ID-kaart) is a chipped picture ID in the Republic of Estonia. An Estonian identity card is officially recognised by all member states of the European Union for intra EU travel. For travelling outside the EU, Estonian citizens may also require a passport.

The card's chip stores a key pair, allowing users to cryptographically sign digital documents based on principles of public key cryptography using DigiDoc. Under Estonian law, since December 15, 2000 the cryptographic signature is legally equivalent to a manual signature.

The Estonian identity card is also used for authentication in Estonia's ambitious Internet-based voting programme. In February 2007, Estonia was the first country in the world to institute electronic voting for parliamentary elections. Over 30 000 voters participated in the country's first e-election. By 2014, at the European Parliament elections, the number of e-voters has increased to more than 100,000 comprising 31% of the total votes cast.

==== Finland ====
In Finland, any citizen can get an identification card (henkilökortti/identitetskort). This, along with the passport, is one of two official identity documents. It is available as an electronic ID card (sähköinen henkilökortti/elektroniskt identitetskort), which enables logging into certain government services on the Internet.

Driving licenses and KELA (social security) cards with a photo are also widely used for general identification purposes even though they are not officially recognized as such. However, KELA has ended the practice of issuing social security cards with the photograph of the bearer, while it has become possible to embed the social security information onto the national ID card. For most purposes when identification is required, only valid documents are ID card, passport or driving license. However, a citizen is not required to carry any of these.

==== France ====
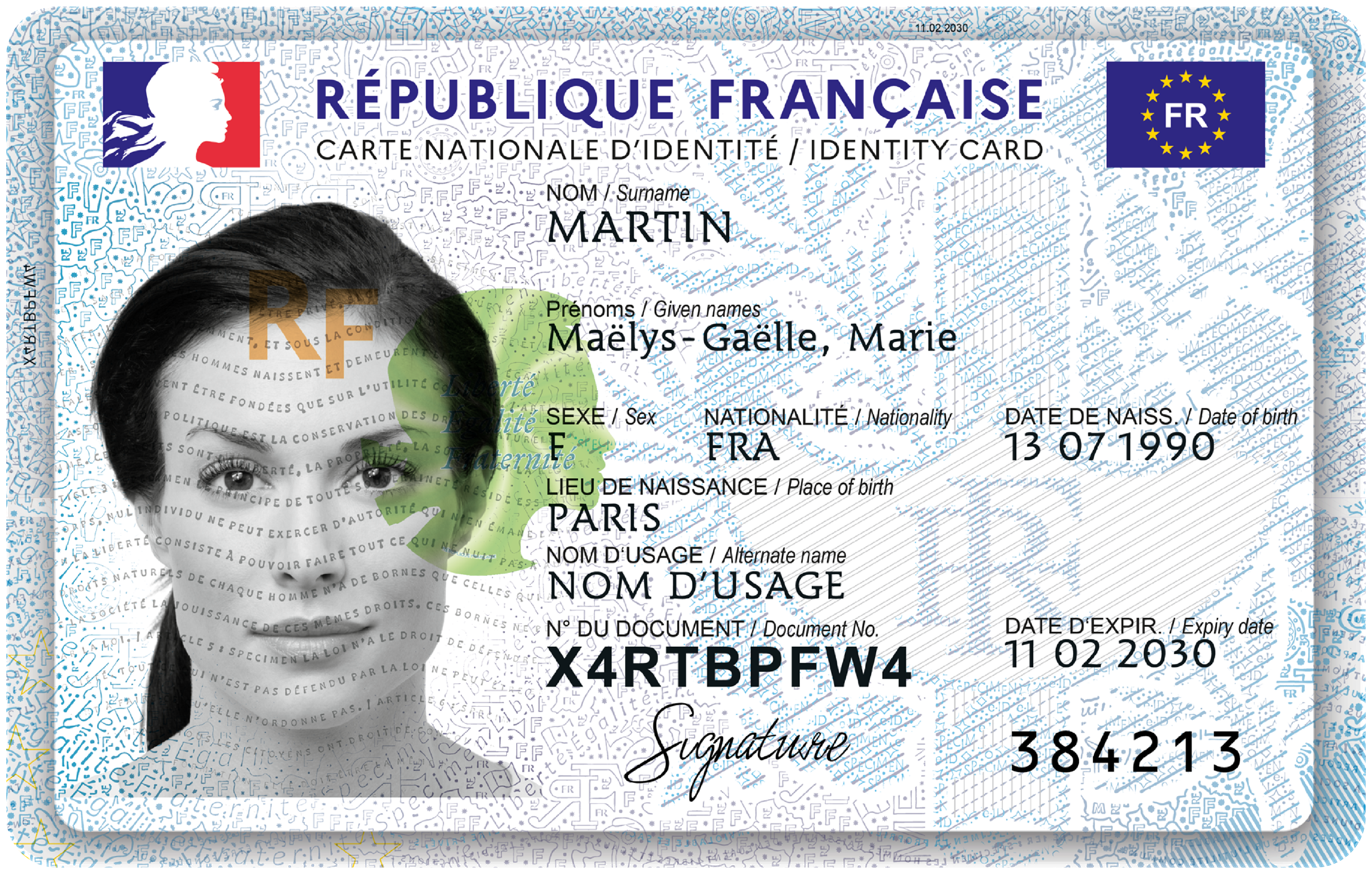
Front of the French identity card specimen as of 2021

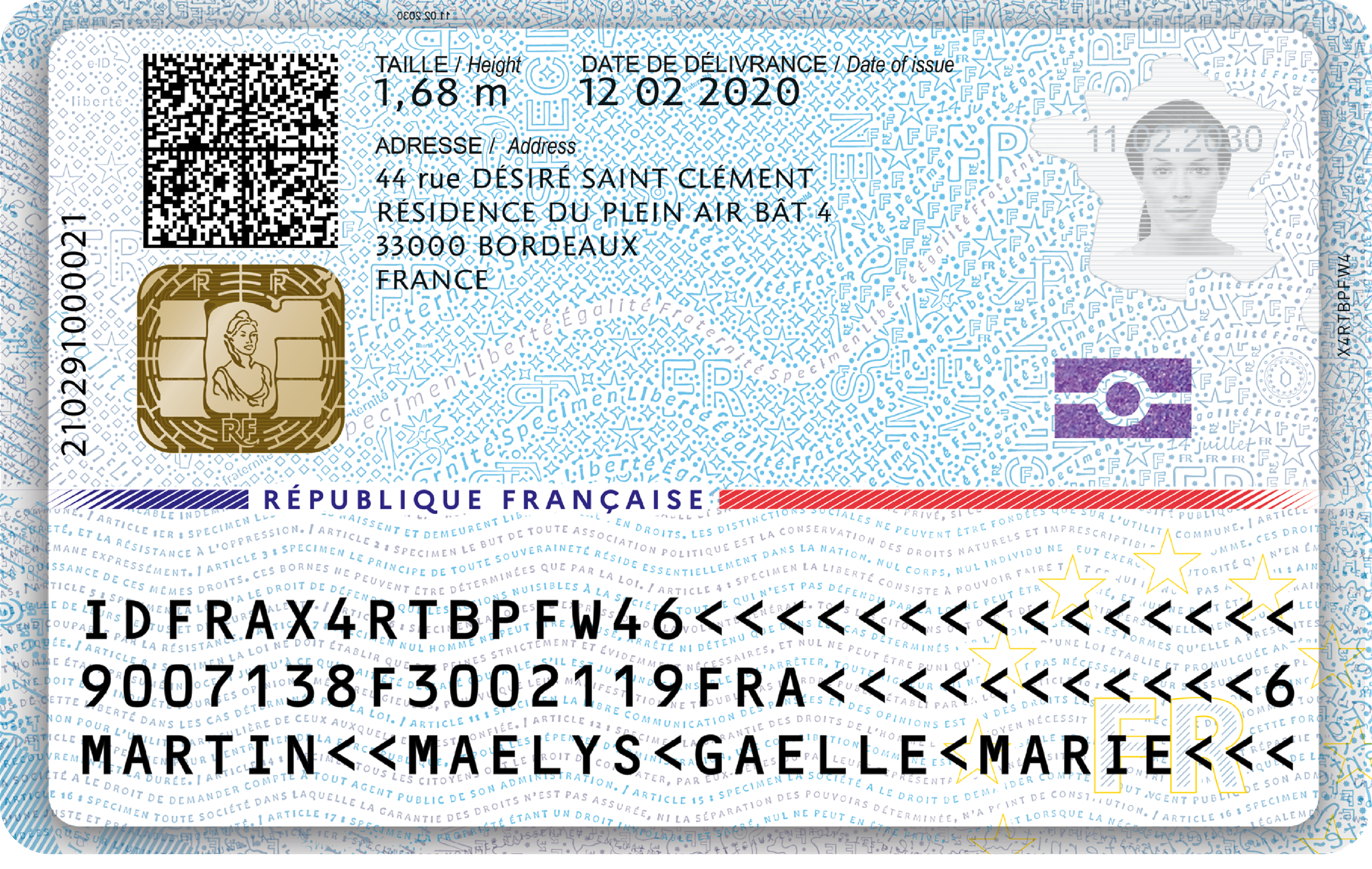
Back of the French identity card specimen as of 2021

France has had a national ID card for all citizens since the beginning of World War II in 1940. Compulsory identity documents were created before, for workers from 1803 to 1890, nomads (gens du voyage) in 1912, and foreigners in 1917 during World War I. National identity cards were first issued as the carte d'identité française under the law of October 27, 1940, and were compulsory for everyone over the age of 16. Identity cards were valid for 10 years, had to be updated within a year in case of change of residence, and their renewal required paying a fee. Under the Vichy regime, in addition to the face photograph, the family name, first names, date and place of birth, the card included the national identity number managed by the national statistics INSEE, which is also used as the national service registration number, as the Social Security account number for health and retirement benefits, for access to court files and for tax purposes. Under the decree 55-1397 of October 22, 1955 a revised non-compulsory card, the carte nationale d'identité (CNI) was introduced.

The law (Art. 78–1 to 78–6 of the French code of criminal procedure (Code de procédure pénale) mentions only that during an ID check performed by police, gendarmerie or customs officer, one can prove his identity "by any means", the validity of which is left to the judgment of the law enforcement official. Though not stated explicitly in the law, an ID card, a driving licence, a passport, a visa, a Carte de Séjour, a voting card are sufficient according to jurisprudence. The decision to accept other documents, with or without the bearer's photograph, like a Social Security card, a travel card or a bank card, is left to the discretion of the law enforcement officer.

According to Art. 78-2 of the French Code of Criminal Procedure, ID checks are only possible:

- alineas 1 & 2: if you are the object of inquiries or investigations, have committed, prepared or attempted to commit an offence or if you are able to give information about it (contrôle judiciaire);
- alinea 4: within 20 km of French borders and in ports, airports and railway stations open to international traffic (contrôle aux frontières);
- alinea 3: whatever the person's behaviour, to prevent a breach of public order and in particular an offence against the safety of persons or property (contrôle administratif).

The last case allows checks of passers-by's ID by the police, especially in neighborhoods with a higher criminality rate which are often the poorest at the condition, according to the Cour de cassation, that the policeman does not refer only to "general and abstract conditions" but to "particular circumstances able to characterise a risk of breach of public order and in particular an offence against the safety of persons or property" (Cass. crim. December 5, 1999, n°99-81153, Bull., n°95).

In case of necessity to establish your identity, not being able to prove it "by any means" (for example the legality of a road traffic procès-verbal depends on it), may lead to a temporary arrest (vérification d'identité) of up to 4 hours for the time strictly required for ascertaining your identity according to art. 78-3 of the French Code of criminal procedure (Code de procédure pénale).

For financial transactions, ID cards and passports are almost always accepted as proof of identity. Due to possible forgery, driver's licenses are sometimes refused. For transactions by cheque involving a larger sum, two different ID documents are frequently requested by merchants.

The current identification cards are now issued free of charge and optional, and are valid for ten years for minors, and fifteen for adults. The current government has proposed a compulsory biometric card system, which has been opposed by human rights groups and by the national authority and regulator on computing systems and databases, the Commission nationale de l'informatique et des libertés, CNIL. Another non-compulsory project is being discussed.

==== Germany ====
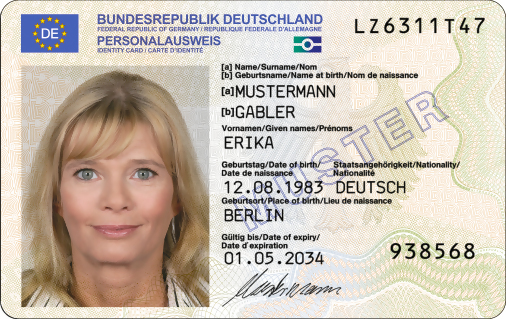
Sample front of a German identity card issued since 2024

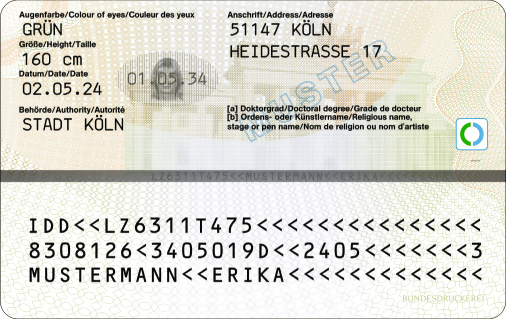
Sample back of a German identity card issued since 2024

It is compulsory for all German citizens aged 16 or older to possess either a Personalausweis (identity card) or a passport but not to carry one. Police officers and other officials have a right to demand to see one of those documents (obligation of identification); however, the law does not state that one is obliged to submit the document at that very moment. But as driver's licences, although sometimes accepted, are not legally accepted forms of identification in Germany, people usually choose to carry their Personalausweis with them.

Beginning from November 2010, German ID cards are issued in the ID-1 format and contain an integrated digital signature. The cards have a photograph and a chip with biometric data, including two now mandatory fingerprints. Until October 2010, German ID cards were issued in ISO/IEC 7810 ID-2 format. On November 1, 2019, German ID cards underwent minor textual adjustments concerning the information field on the surname and surname at birth. On August 2, 2021, German ID cards were adapted to Regulation (EU) 2019/1157. The changes include the country code "DE" being shown in white in the blue European flag on the front and two fingerprints (as an encrypted image file) becoming mandatory. In addition, the version number was added to the machine-readable zone. On May 2, 2024, the doctor's title was moved to the back side of the identity card.

==== Greece ====
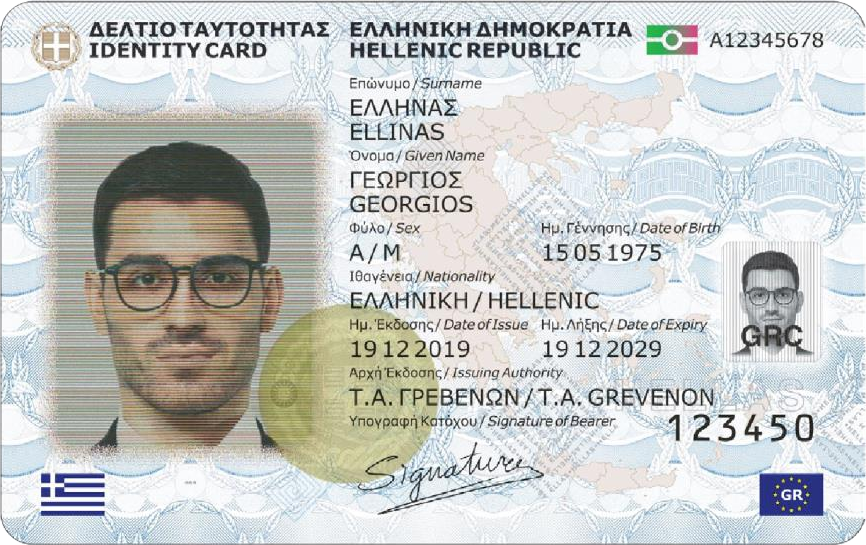
Greek ID card (front)

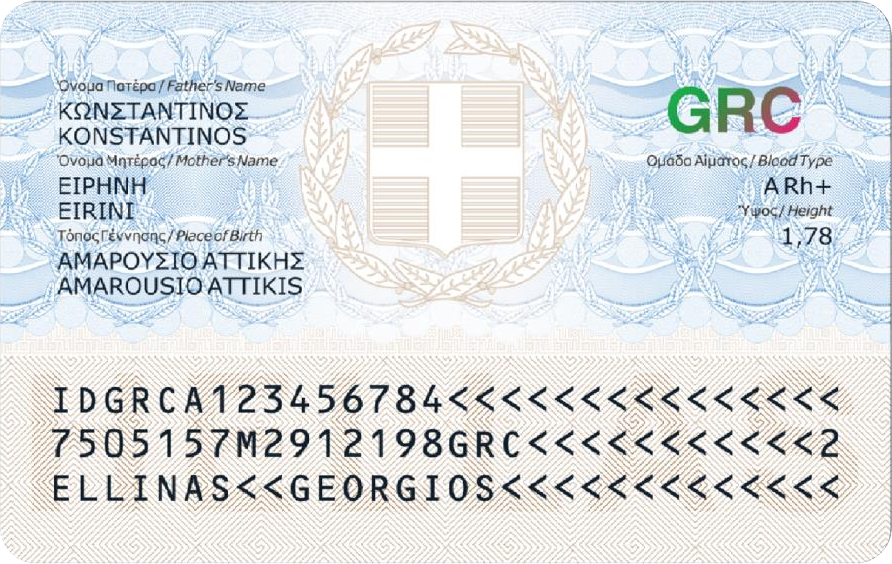
Greek ID card (back)

A compulsory, universal ID system based on personal ID cards has been in place in Greece since World War II. ID cards are issued by the police on behalf of the ministry responsible for the Headquarters of the Hellenic Police (Ministry of Public Order or Ministry of Citizen Protection or Ministry of the Interior at times) and display the holder's signature, standardized face photograph, name and surname, legal ascendants name and surname, date and place of birth, height, municipality, and the issuing police precinct. There are also two optional fields designed to facilitate emergency medical care: ABO and Rhesus factor blood typing.

Fields included in previous ID card formats, such as vocation or profession, religious denomination, domiciliary address, name and surname of spouse, fingerprint, eye and hair color, citizenship and ethnicity were removed permanently as being intrusive of personal data and/or superfluous for the sole purpose of personal identification.

Since 2000, name fields have been filled in both Greek and Latin characters. According to the Signpost Service of the European Commission [reply to Enquiry 36581], old type Greek ID cards "are as valid as the new type according to Greek law and thus they constitute valid travel documents that all other EU Member States are obliged to accept". In addition to being equivalent to passports within the EU and EFTA, Greek ID cards are the principal means of identification of voters during elections.

Since 2005, the procedure to issue an ID card has been automated and now all citizens over 12 years of age must have an ID card, which is issued within one work day. Prior to that date, the age of compulsory issue was at 14 and the whole procedure could last several months.

In Greece, an ID card is a citizen's most important state document. For instance, it is required to perform banking transactions if the teller personnel is unfamiliar with the apparent account holder, to interact with the Citizen Service Bureaus (KEP), receive parcels or registered mail etc. Citizens are also required to produce their ID card at the request of law enforcement personnel.

All the above functions can be fulfilled also with a valid Greek passport (e.g., for people who have lost their ID card and have not yet applied for a new one, people who happen to carry their passport instead of their ID card or Greeks who reside abroad and do not have an identity card, which can be issued only in Greece in contrast to passports also issued by consular authorities abroad).

==== Hungary ====
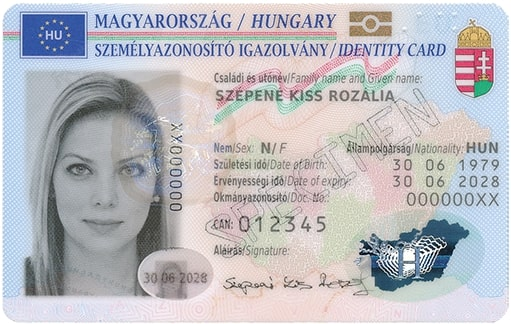
Front of a Hungarian national ID card

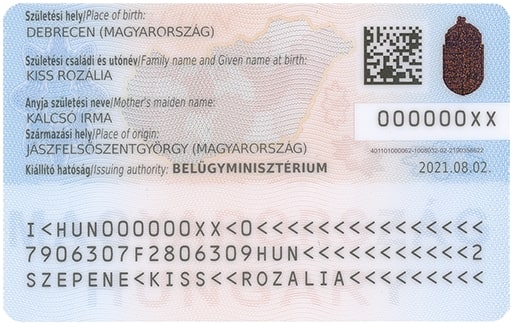
Back of a Hungarian national ID card

Currently, there are three types of valid ID documents (Személyazonosító igazolvány, née Személyi igazolvány, abbr. Sz.ig.) in Hungary: the oldest valid ones are hard-covered, multi-page booklets and issued before 1989 by the People's Republic of Hungary, the second type is a soft-cover, multi-page booklet issued after the change of regime; these two have one, original photo of the owner embedded, with original signatures of the owner and the local police's representative. The third type is a plastic card with the photo and the signature of the holder digitally reproduced. These are generally called Personal Identity Card.

The plastic card shows the owners full name, maiden name if applicable, birth date and place, mother's maiden name, the cardholder's gender, the ID's validity period and the local state authority which issued the card. The card has a 6 digit number + 2 letter unique ID and a separate machine readable zone on the back for identity document scanning devices. It does not have any information about the owner's residential address, nor their personal identity number – this sensitive information is contained on a separate card, called a Residency Card (Lakcímkártya). Personal identity numbers have been issued since 1975; they have the following format in numbers: gender (1 number) – birth date (6 numbers) – unique ID (4 numbers). They are no longer used as a personal identification number, but as a statistical signature.

Other valid documents are the passport (blue colored or red colored with RFID chip) and the driver's license; an individual is required to have at least one of them on hand all the time. The Personal Identity Card is mandatory to vote in state elections or open a bank account in the country.

==== Iceland ====
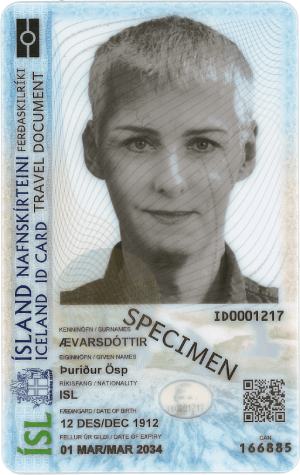
Icelandic ID card (front)

Icelandic state-issued identity cards are called "Nafnskírteini" (lit. 'name certificate'). The ID cards are voluntary, conforming to biometric ICAO and EU standards and can be used as a travel document in the EU/EFTA and the Nordic countries. Identity documents are not mandatory to carry or own by law (unless driving a car), but can be needed for bank services, age verification and other situations. Most people (91%) have driving licences for day-to-day use.

==== Ireland ====
Ireland does not issue mandatory national identity cards as such. Except for a brief period during the Second World War when the Irish Department of External Affairs issued identity cards to those wishing to travel to the United Kingdom, Ireland has never issued national identity cards as such.

Identity documentation is optional for Irish and British citizens. Nevertheless, identification is mandatory to obtain certain services such as air travel, banking, interactions regarding welfare and public services, age verification, and additional situations.

"Non-nationals" aged 16 years and over must produce identification on demand to any immigration officer or a member of the Garda Síochána (police).

Passport booklets, passport cards, driving licences, GNIB Registration Certificates and other forms of identity cards can be used for identification. Ireland has issued optional passport cards since October 2015. The cards are the size of a credit card and have all the information from the biographical page of an Irish passport booklet and can be used explicitly for travel in the EU and EFTA.

Ireland issues a "Public Services Card" which is useful when identification is needed for contacts regarding welfare and public services. They have photographs but not birth dates and are therefore not accepted by banks. The card is also not considered as being an identity card by the Department of Employment Affairs and Social Protection (DEASP). In an Oireachtas (parliament) committee hearing held on February 22, 2018, Tim Duggan of that department stated "A national ID card is an entirely different idea. People are generally compelled to carry (such a card)."

==== Italy ====
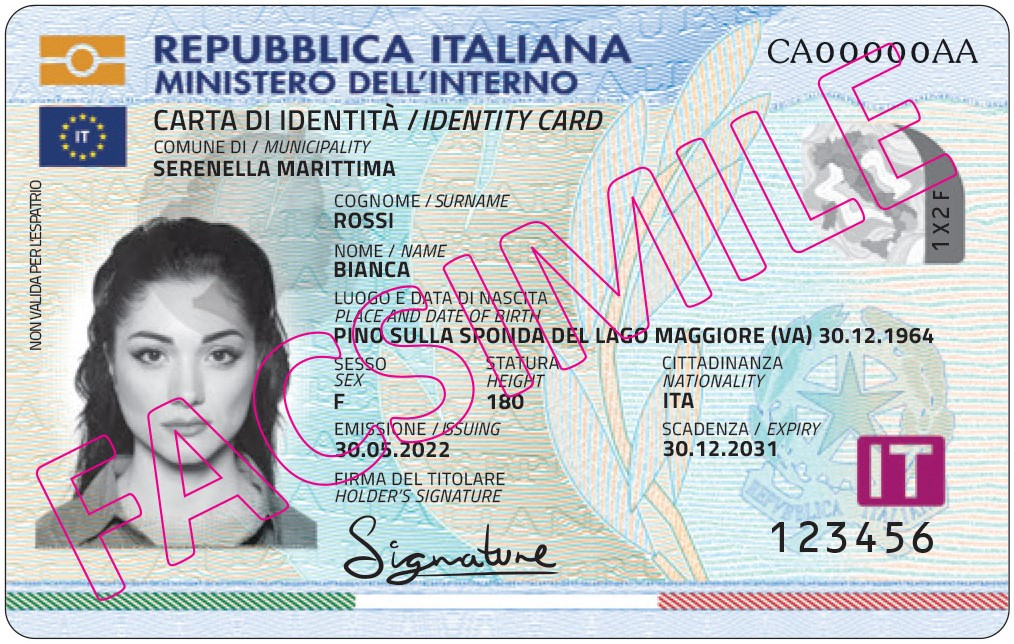
Current Italian ID card (front)

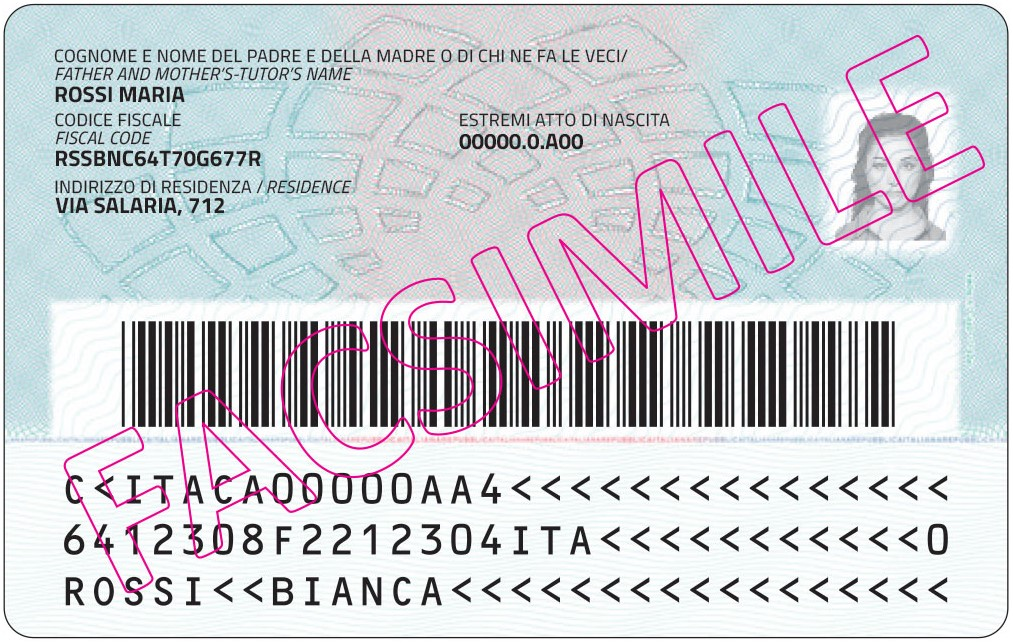
Current Italian ID card (back)

Anyone who is legally resident in Italy, whether a citizen or not, is entitled to request an identity card at the local municipality. However, only Italian citizens can use it as a travel document in lieu of a passport, and get it on a consulate/embassy.

It is valid in all Europe (except in Belarus, Russia, Ukraine and the UK) and to travel to Turkey, Georgia, Egypt and Tunisia.

The Italian citizen is not legally required to carry an identification document, as they have the right to identify themselves verbally. However, if they are asked to present it by law enforcement and have it with them at that moment, they must show it to avoid committing an offense. If public-security officers are not convinced of the claimed identity, such as may be the case for a verbally provided identity claim, they may keep the claimant in custody until his/her identity is ascertained; such an arrest is limited to the time necessary for identification and has no legal consequence.

Instead, all foreigners in Italy are required by law to have an ID with them at all times. Citizens of EU member countries must be always ready to display an identity document that is legally government-issued in their country. Non-EU residents must have their passport with customs entrance stamp or a residence permit issued by Italian authorities; while all resident/immigrant aliens must have a residence permit (they are otherwise illegal and face deportation), foreigners from certain non-EU countries staying in Italy for a limited amount of time (typically for tourism) may be only required to have their passport with a proper customs stamp.

The current Italian identity document is a contactless electronic card made of polycarbonate in the ID-1 format with many security features and containing the following items printed by laser engraving:

1. On the front: photo, card number, municipality, name, surname, place and date of birth, sex, height, nationality, date of issue, date of expiry, signature, Card Access Number, (optional) the sentence "non valida per l'espatrio" only if the document is not valid abroad
2. On the back: surname and name of parents or legal guardian (if the applicant is not an adult yet), Italian fiscal code, Italian birth code, residence address, (optional) additional information if the owner is residing abroad, Italian fiscal code in form of barcode, Machine Readable Zone

Moreover, the embedded electronic microprocessor chip stores the holder's picture, name, surname, place and date of birth, residency and (only if aged 12 and more) two fingerprints.

The card is integrated into the Italian SSO infrastructure, the SPID and permits the holder to use the NFC chip of the card as a login for that service.

The card is issued by the Ministry of the Interior in collaboration with the IPZS in Rome and sent to the applicant within 6 business days.

The validity is 10 years for adults, 5 years for minors aged 3–18, 3 years for children aged 0–3 and it is extended or shortened in order to expire always on birthday.

However, the old classic Italian ID card is still valid and in the process of being replaced with the new eID card since 4 July 2016, because the lack of a Machine Readable Zone, the odd size, the fact that is made of paper and so easy to forge, often cause delays at border controls and, furthermore, foreign countries outside the EU sometimes refuse to accept it as a valid document. These common criticisms were considered in the development of the new Italian electronic identity card, which is in the more common credit-card format and now has many of the latest security features available nowadays.

==== Latvia ====
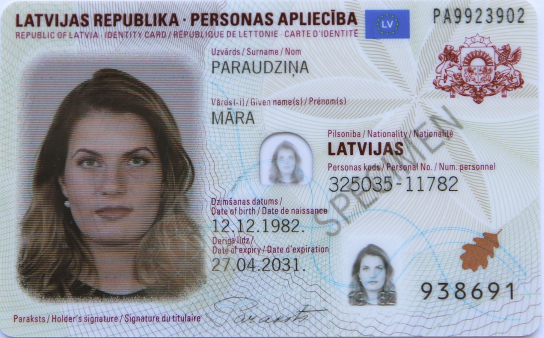
Current Latvian identity document

The Latvian "Personal certificate" is issued to Latvian citizens and is valid for travel within Europe (except Belarus, Russia, Ukraine and UK), Georgia, French Overseas territories and Montserrat (max. 14 days).

==== Liechtenstein ====
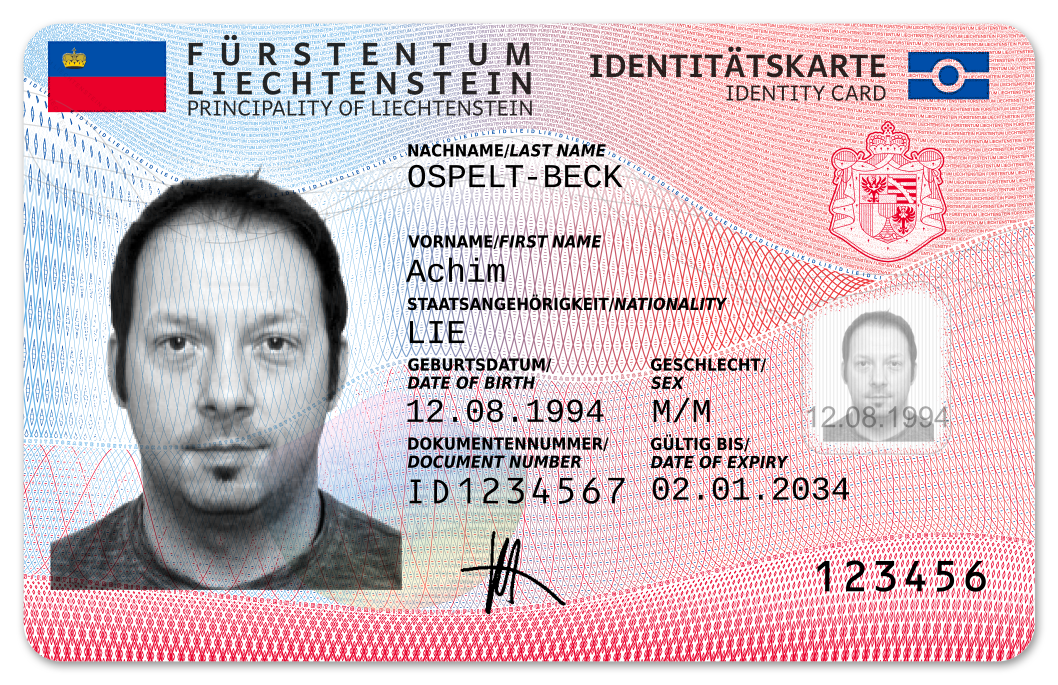
Current Liechtensteiner identity document

The Principality of Liechtenstein has a voluntary ID card system for citizens, the Identitätskarte. Liechtenstein citizens are entitled to use a valid national identity card to exercise their right of free movement in the EU and EFTA

==== Lithuania ====
Lithuanian Personal Identity Card can be used as primary evidence of Lithuanian citizenship, just like a passport and can also be used as proof of identity both inside and outside Lithuania. It is valid for travel within most European nations.

==== Luxembourg ====
The Luxembourgish identity card is issued to Luxembourgish citizens. It serves as proof of identity and nationality and can also be used for travel within the European Union and a number of other European countries.

==== Malta ====
Maltese identity cards are issued to Maltese citizens and other lawful residents of Malta. They can be used as a travel document when visiting countries in the European Union and the European Free Trade Association.

==== Netherlands ====
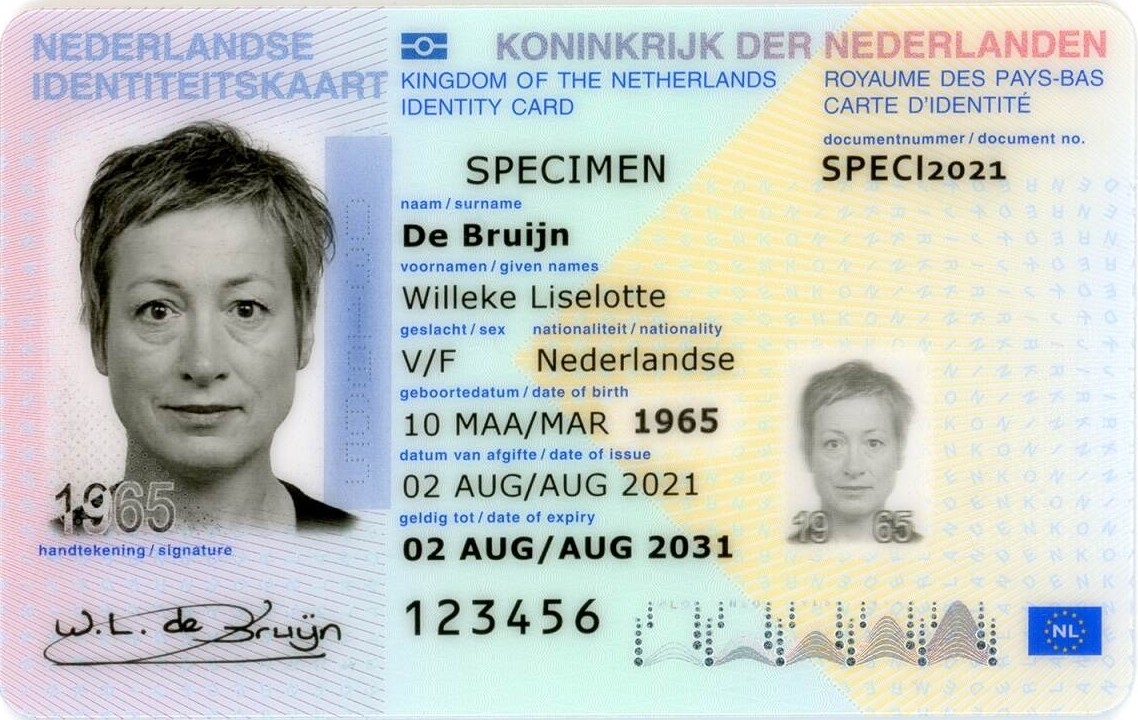
Dutch identity document, front

Dutch citizens from the age of 14 are required to be able to show a valid identity document upon request by a police officer or similar official. Furthermore, identity documents are required when opening bank accounts and upon start of work for a new employer. Official identity documents for residents in the Netherlands are:

- Dutch passport
- Dutch identity card
- Alien's Residence permit
- Geprivilegieerdenkaart (amongst others for the corps diplomatique and their family members)
- Passports/national ID cards of members of other EU and EFTA countries

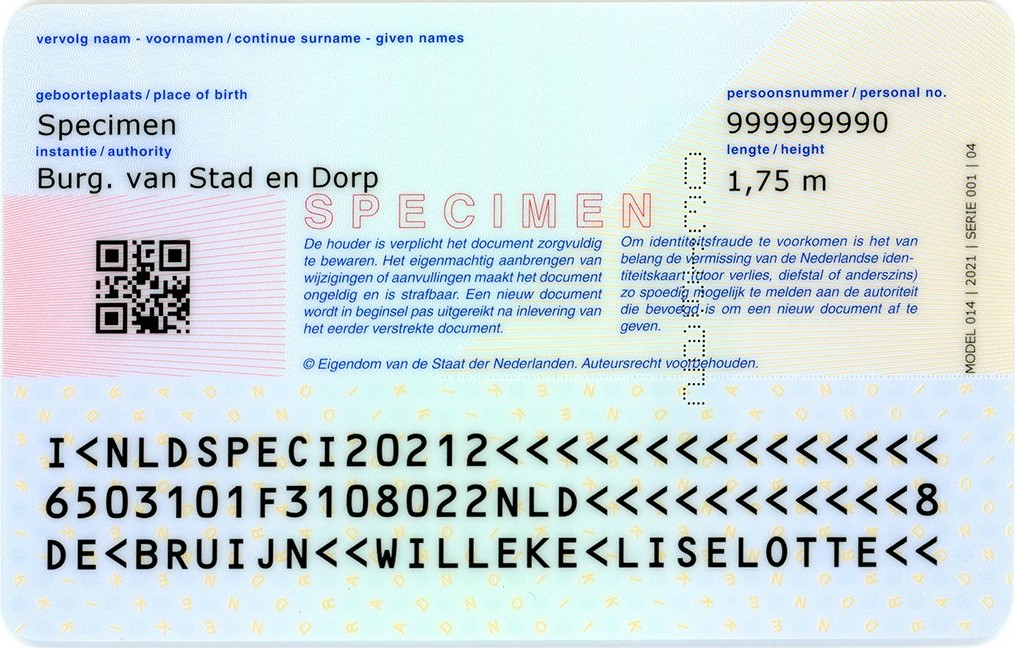
Dutch identity document, back

For the purpose of identification in public (but not for other purposes), also a Dutch driving license often may serve as an identity document. In the Caribbean Netherlands, Dutch and other EU/EFTA identity cards are not valid; and the Identity card BES is an obligatory document for all residents.

==== Norway ====
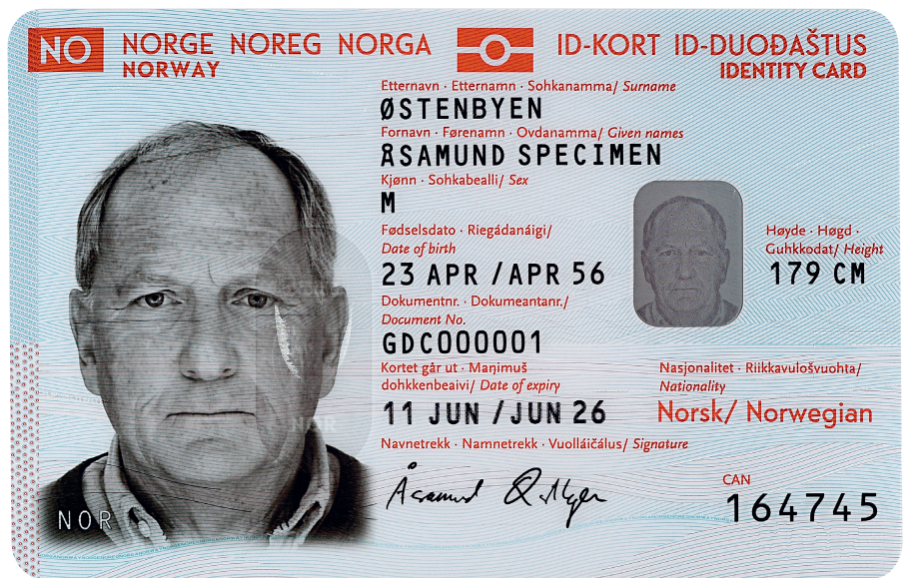
Front of a Norwegian national ID card

In Norway there is no law penalising non-possession of an identity document. But there are rules requiring it for services like banking, air travel and voting (where personal recognition or other identification methods have not been possible).

The following documents are generally considered valid (varying a little, since no law lists them): Nordic driving licence, passport (often only from EU and EFTA), national ID card from EU, Norwegian ID card from banks and some more. Bank ID cards are printed on the reverse of Norwegian debit cards. To get a bank ID card either a Nordic passport or another passport together with Norwegian residence and work permit is needed.

The Norwegian identity card was introduced on November 30, 2020. There are two versions of the card, one that states Norwegian citizenship and is usable for exercising freedom of movement within the EU and EFTA and the other for general identification. The plan started in 2007 and was delayed several times. Banks were campaigning to be freed from the task of issuing ID cards, stating that it was supposed to be the responsibility of state authorities. Some banks ceased issuing ID cards, so people had to carry their passport for credit card purchases or buying prescribed medication if not in possession of a driving licence.

Non-citizens resident in Norway are not eligible for the Norwegian identity card. When banks stopped issuing the cards and it was suggested that citizens get a national identity card, foreigners who did not have a driving licence, or a passport from their country were left without proof of identity, prompting plans in 2022 to issue a version of the Norwegian identity card for foreign citizens.

As of 2020, a digital ID document was introduced in Norway. It requires a phone app and is useful for age checks, picking up postal packages, and other purposes. To activate it, a passport or national ID-card is needed. Many young people targeted for alcohol age checks or without a driver's license tend to use it, but also some older citizens.

==== Poland ====
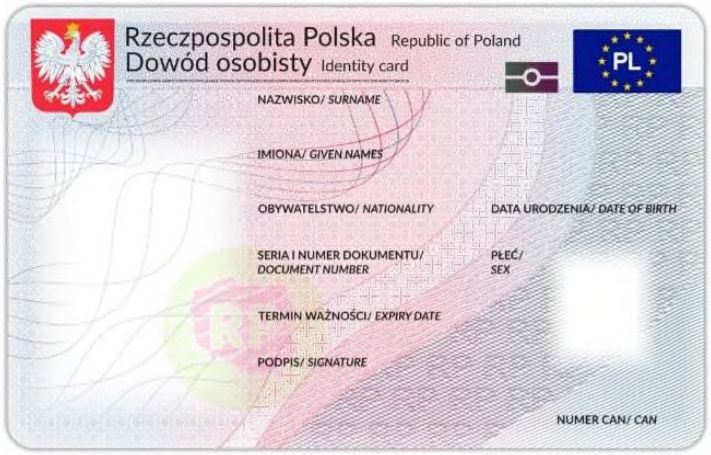
Polish identity document, front

Every Polish citizen 18 years of age or older residing permanently in Poland must have an Identity Card (dokument tożsamości) issued by the local Office of Civic Affairs. Polish citizens living permanently abroad are entitled, but not required, to have one.

==== Portugal ====
All Portuguese citizens are required by law to obtain an Identity Card when they turn 6 years of age. They are not required to carry it at all times but are obliged to present it to the authorities if requested.

The old format of the cards (yellow laminated paper document) featured a portrait of the bearer, their fingerprint, and the names of parent(s), among other information.

They are currently being replaced by grey plastic cards with a chip, called Cartão de Cidadão (Identity card Card), which now incorporate NIF (Tax Number), Cartão de Utente (Health Card) and Social Security, all of which are protected by a PIN obtained when the card is issued.

The new Citizen's Card is technologically more advanced than the former Identity Card and has the following characteristics:

- From the physical point of view the Citizen's Card will have a 'smart card' format and will replace the existing Identity Card, taxpayer card, Social Security card, voter's card and National Health Service user's card.
- From the visual point of view the front of the card will display the holder's photograph and basic personal details. The back will list the numbers under which the holder is registered with the different bodies whose cards the Citizen's Card combines and replaces. The back will also contain an optical reader and the chip.
- From the electronic point of view the card will have a contact chip, with digital certificates (for electronic authentication and signature purposes). The chip may also hold the same information as the physical card itself, together with other data such as the holder's address.

==== Romania ====
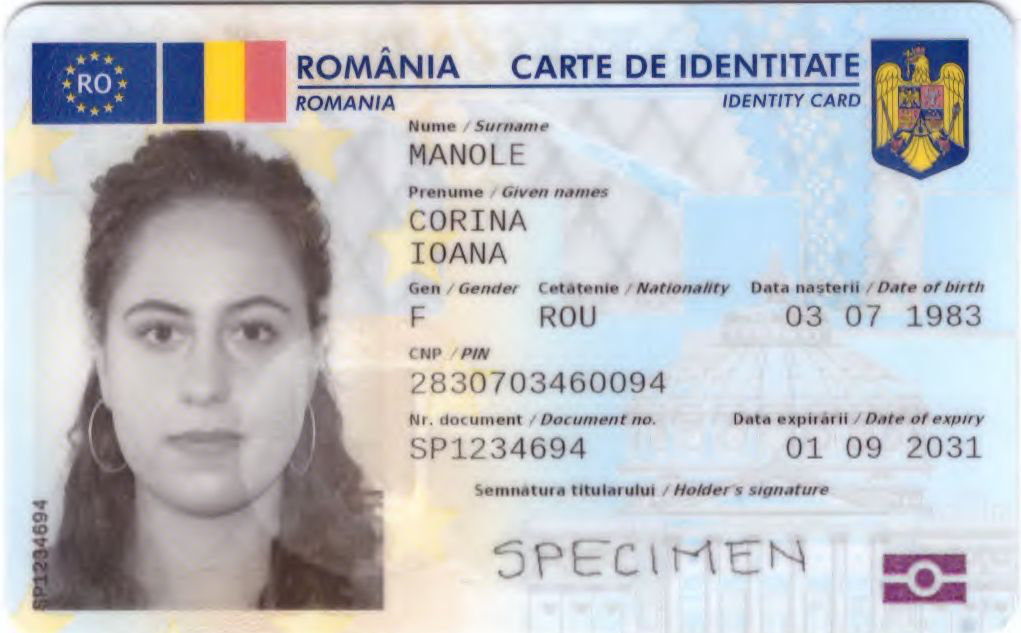
Specimen of a Romanian identity card issued since 2021

Every citizen of Romania must register for an ID card (Carte de identitate, abbreviated CI) at the age of 14. The CI offers proof of the identity, address, sex and other data of the possessor. It has to be renewed every 10 years. It can be used instead of a passport for travel inside the European Union and several other countries outside the EU.

Another ID card is the Provisional ID Card (Cartea de Identitate Provizorie) issued temporarily when an individual cannot get a normal ID card. Its validity extends for up to 1 year. It cannot be used in order to travel within the EU, unlike the normal ID card.

Other forms of officially accepted identification include the driver's license and the birth certificate. However, these are accepted only in limited circumstances and cannot take the place of the ID card in most cases. The ID card is mandatory for dealing with government institutions, banks or currency exchange shops. A valid passport may also be accepted, but usually only for foreigners.

In addition, citizens can be expected to provide the personal identification number (CNP) in many circumstances; purposes range from simple unique identification and internal book-keeping (for example when drawing up the papers for the warranty of purchased goods) to being asked for identification by the police. The CNP is 13 characters long, with the format S-YY-MM-DD-RR-XXX-Y. Where S is the sex, YY is year of birth, MM is month of birth, DD is day of birth, RR is a regional id, XXX is a unique random number and Y is a control digit.

Presenting the ID card is preferred but not mandatory when asked by police officers; however, in such cases people are expected to provide a CNP or alternate means of identification which can be checked on the spot (via radio if needed).

The information on the ID card is required to be kept updated by the owner, current address of domicile in particular. Doing otherwise can expose the citizen to certain fines or be denied service by those institutions that require a valid, up to date card. In spite of this, it is common for people to let the information lapse or go around with expired ID cards.

==== Slovakia ====
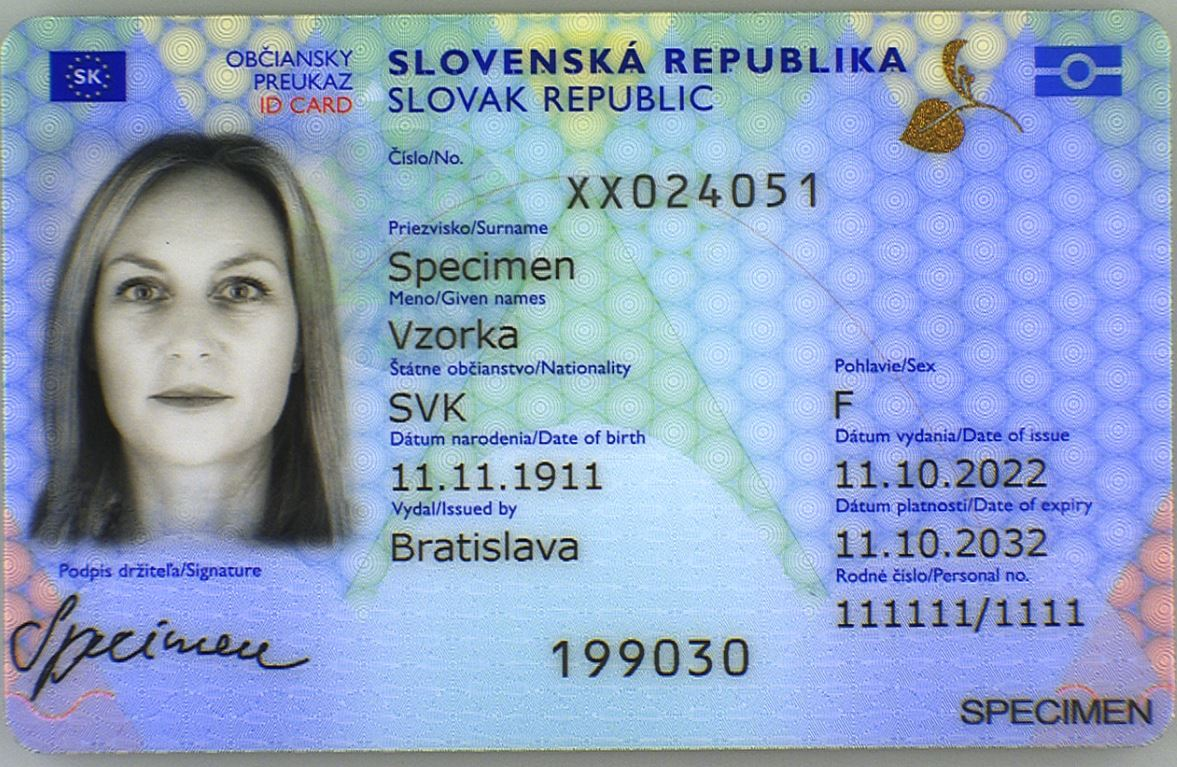
Slovak ID card (front)

The Slovak ID card (Slovak: Občiansky preukaz) is a picture ID in Slovakia. It is issued to citizens of the Slovak Republic who are 15 or older. A Slovak ID card is officially recognised by all member states of the EU/EFTA for travel. For travel outside the EU, Slovak citizens may also require the Slovak passport, which is a legally accepted form of picture ID as well. Police officers and some other officials have a right to demand to see one of those documents, and the law states that one is obliged to submit such a document at that very moment. If one fails to comply, law enforcement officers are allowed to insist on personal identification at the police station.

==== Slovenia ====
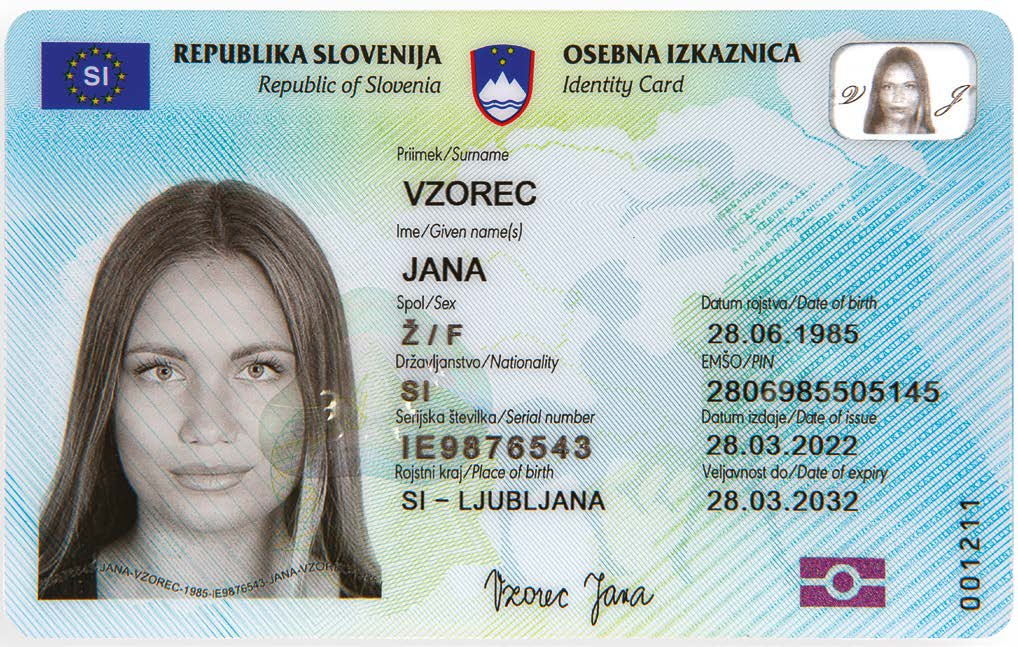
Slovenian identity card (front)

Every Slovenian citizen regardless of age has the right to acquire an identity card (Slovene: osebna izkaznica), and every citizen of the Republic of Slovenia of 18 years of age or older is obliged by law to acquire one and carry it at all times (or any other identity document with a picture, e.g., the Slovene passport or a driver's license). The card is a valid identity document within all member states of the European Union for travel within the EU. With the exception of the Faroe Islands and Greenland, it may be used to travel outside of the EU to Norway, Liechtenstein, BiH, Macedonia, Montenegro, Serbia, and Switzerland. The front side displays the name and surname, sex, nationality, date of birth, and expiration date of the card, as well as the number of the ID card, a black and white photograph, and a signature. The back contains the permanent address, administrative unit, date of issue, EMŠO, and a code with key information in a machine-readable zone. Depending on the holder's age, the card is valid for 5 years or 10 years or permanently, and it is valid 1 year for foreigners living in Slovenia, in case of repeated loss, and in some other circumstances. Since 28 March 2022, it is possible but not mandatory to acquire a biometric ID card. An identity document in healthcare institutions is the healthcare insurance card. Since April 2023, a biometric ID card may be used instead.

==== Spain ====
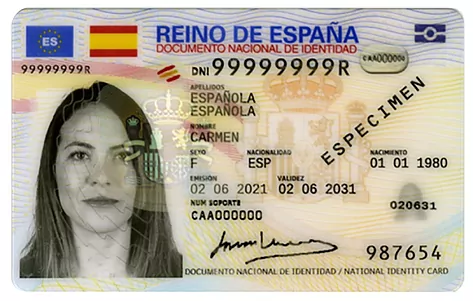
Current Spanish identity document (front)

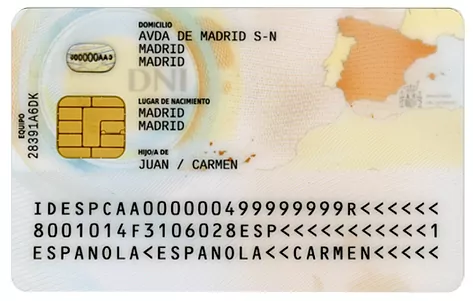
(back)

In Spain, citizens, resident foreigners, and companies have similar but distinct identity numbers, some with prefix letters, all with a check-code:

- NIF Both natural and legal persons have a tax code or Número de Identificación Fiscal (NIF), which is the same as their identity document. For companies this was formerly known as Código de Identificación Fiscal (CIF)
- DNI Spanish citizens have a National Idenitity Card (DNI), which bears this number without any letter prefix. This is sometimes known by obsolete names such as Cédula de Ciudadanía (CC),Carné de Identidad (CI) or Cédula de Identidad (CI).

Spanish citizens under 14 may, but over 14 must, acquire a National Identity Card (DNI). It is issued by the National Police formerly ID-1 (bankcard) format paper encapsulated in plastic. Since 2006 a new version of the 'DNI' has been introduced. The new 'Electronic DNI' is a Smart card that allows for digital signing of documents. The chip contains most of the personal information printed on the card and a digitized version of the bearer's face, signature and fingerprints.

On the front there is a photograph, the name and surname (see Spanish naming customs), the bearer's signature, an id number, the issue date and the expiry date. On the reverse appears the date and place of birth, the gender, legal ascendants name and the current address. At the bottom there is key information in a machine-readable zone. Depending on holder's age, the card has a validity of 5 years, 10 years or indefinite (for the elderly).

- CIF Código de Identidad Fiscal has been retained only for associations and foundations that have a CIF which starts with the letter G.
- NIE Foreigners (eXtranjeros in Spanish) are issued with a Número de Identificación de Extranjero, which starts with the letter X or Y. NIE cards for EU citizens have been abolished and replaced by a printed A4 page, which does not need to be carried, whilst cards are still issued to non-EU citizens, now following the standard European format.

Despite the NIF/CIF/NIE/NIF distinctions the identity number is unique and always has eight digits (the NIE has 7 digits) followed by a letter calculated from a 23-Modular arithmetic check used to verify the correctness of the number. The letters I, Ñ, O and U are not used and the sequence is as follows:

0	1	2	3	4	5	6	7	8	9	10	11	12	13	14	15	16	17	18	19	20	21	22
T	R	W	A	G	M	Y	F	P	D	X	B	N	J	Z	S	Q	V	H	L	C	K	E

This number is the same for tax, social security and all legal purposes. Without this number (or a foreign equivalent such as a passport number), a contract may not be enforceable.

In Spain the formal identity number on an ID card is the most important piece of identification. It is used in all public and private transactions. It is required to open a bank account, to sign a contract, to have state insurance and to register at a university and should be shown when being fined by a police officer. It is one of the official documents required to vote at any election, although any other form of official ID such as a driving licence or passport may be used. The card also constitutes a valid travel document within the European Union.

Non-resident citizens of countries such as the United Kingdom, where passport numbers are not fixed for the holder's life but change with renewal, may experience difficulty with legal transactions after the document is renewed since the old number is no longer verifiable on a valid (foreign) passport. However, a NIE is issued for life and does not change and can be used for the same purposes.

==== Sweden ====
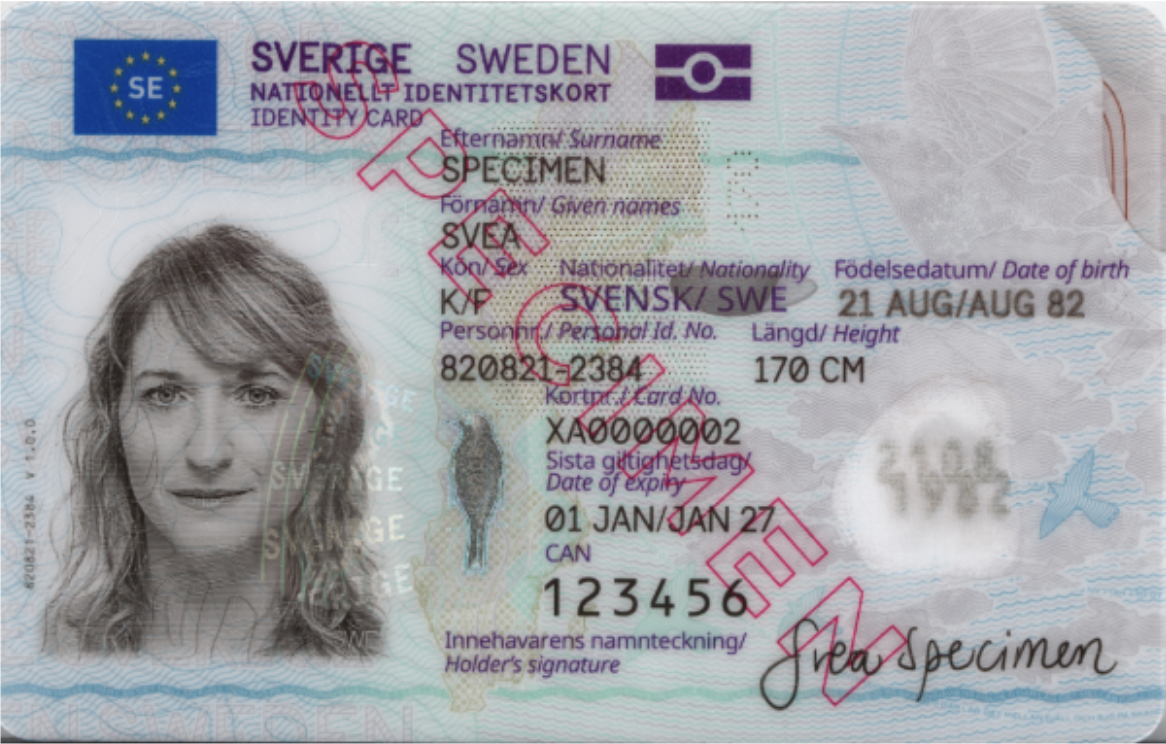
Swedish identity document

Sweden does not have a legal statute for compulsory identity documents. However, ID cards are regularly used to ascertain a person's identity when completing certain transactions. These include but are not limited to banking and age verification. Also, interactions with public authorities often require it, in spite of the fact that there is no law explicitly requiring it, because there are laws requiring authorities to somehow verify people's identity. Without Swedish identity documents difficulties can occur accessing health care services, receiving prescription medications and getting salaries or grants. From 2008, EU passports have been accepted for these services due to EU legislation (with exceptions including banking), but non-EU passports are not accepted. Identity cards have therefore become an important part of everyday life.

There are currently three public authorities that issue ID cards: the Swedish Tax Agency, the Swedish Police Authority, and the Swedish Transport Agency.

The Tax Agency cards can only be used within Sweden to validate a person's identity, but they can be obtained both by Swedish citizens and those that currently reside in Sweden. A Swedish personal identity number is required. It is possible to get one without having any Swedish ID card. In this case a person holding such a card must guarantee the identity, and the person must be a verifiable relative or the boss at the company the person has been working or a few other verifiable people.

The Police can only issue identity documents to Swedish citizens. They issue an internationally recognised identity card according to EU standard usable for intra-European travel, and Swedish passports which are acceptable as identity documents worldwide.

The Transport Agency issues driving licences, which are valid as identity documents in Sweden. To obtain one, one must be approved as a driver and strictly have another Swedish identity document as proof of identity.

In the past there have been certain groups that have experienced problems obtaining valid identification documents. This was due to the initial process that was required to validate one's identity, unregulated security requirements by the commercial companies which issued them. Since July 2009, the Tax Agency has begun to issue ID cards, which has simplified the identity validation process for foreign passport holders. There are still requirements for identity validation that can cause trouble, especially for foreign citizens, but the list of people who can validate one's identity has been extended.

==== Switzerland ====
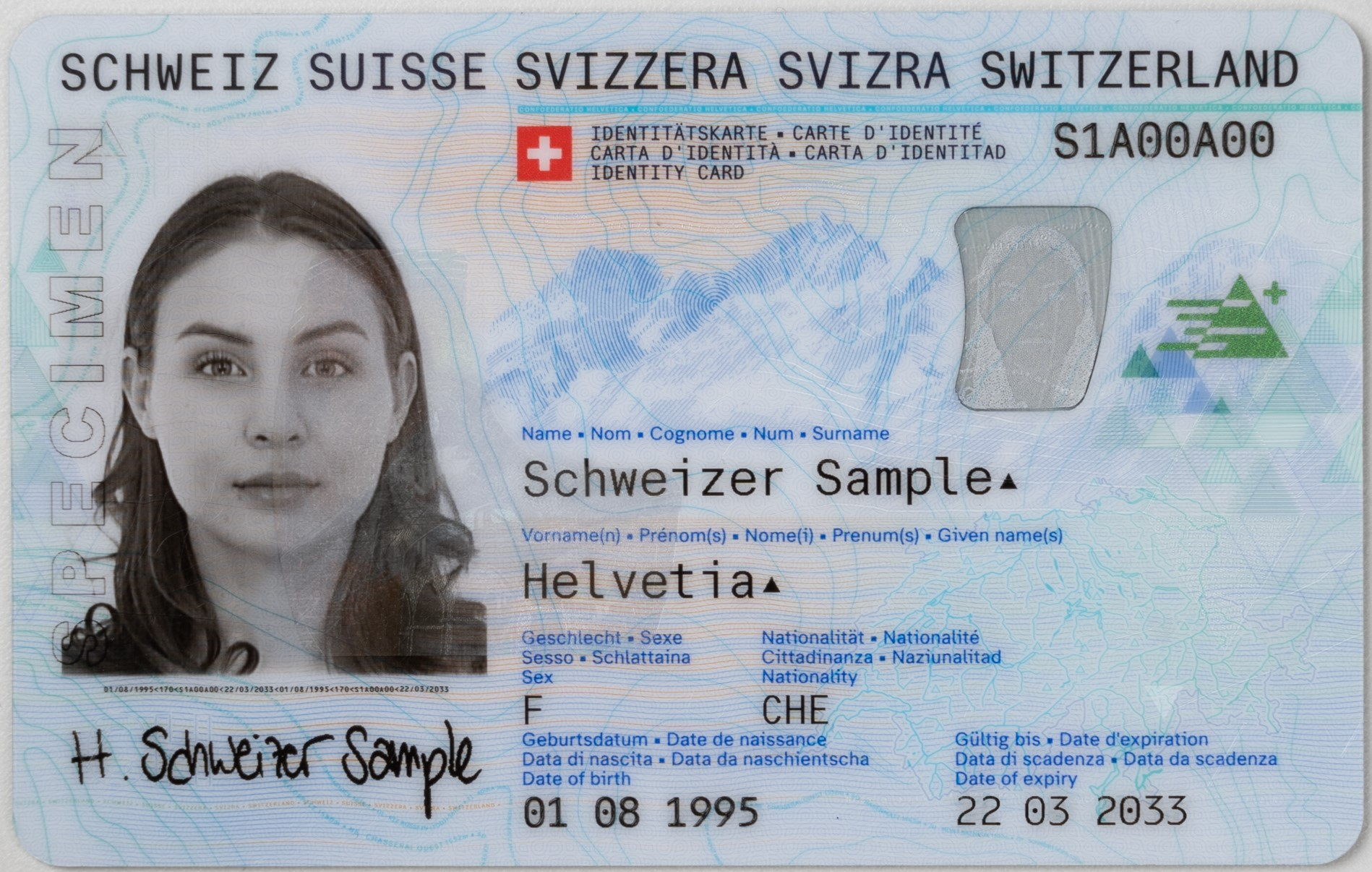
Current Swiss identity card

Swiss citizens have no obligation of identification in Switzerland and thus, are not required by law to be able to show a valid identity document upon request by a police officer or similar official. Furthermore, identity documents are required when opening a bank account or when dealing with public administration.

Relevant in daily life of Swiss citizens are Swiss ID card and Swiss driver's license; the latter needs to be presented upon request by a police officer, when driving a motor-vehicle as e.g., a car, a motorcycle, a bus or a truck. Swiss citizens are entitled to use a valid national identity card to exercise their right of free movement in EFTA and the EU.

Swiss passport is needed only for e.g., travel abroad to countries not accepting Swiss ID card as travel document.

=== Other European countries ===
==== Andorra ====
No national identity card in the principality. Passports and driving licenses are most commonly used for identification. When visiting France or Spain a passport is needed in lack of a national identity card, although driving licenses are often used and accepted unofficially.

==== Albania ====
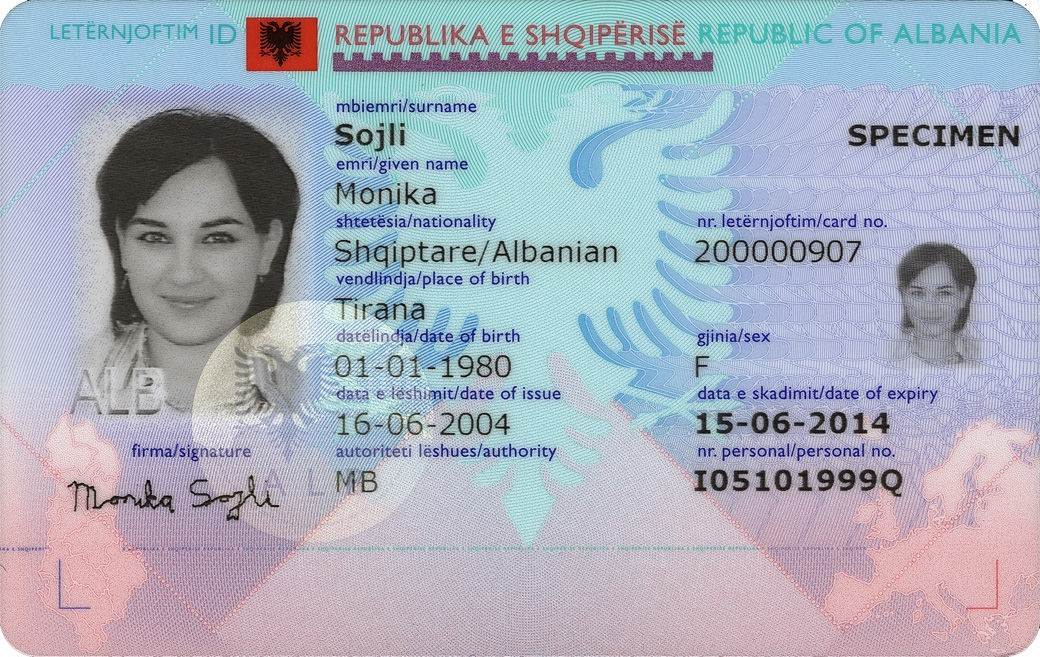
Albanian electronic ID Card 2009

From January 12, 2009, the Government of Albania is issuing a compulsory electronic and biometric ID Card (Letërnjoftim) for its citizens. Every citizen at age 16 must apply for Biometric ID card.

==== Azerbaijan ====
Azerbaijan issues a compulsory ID Card (Şəxsiyyət vəsiqəsi) for its citizens.

Every citizen at age 16 must apply for ID card.

==== Belarus ====
Belarus has combined the international passport and the internal passport into one document which is compulsory from age 14. It follows the international passport convention but has extra pages for domestic use.

==== Bosnia and Herzegovina ====
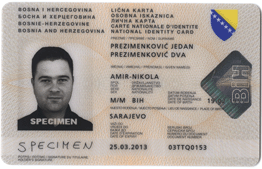
Bosnian identity card

Bosnia and Herzegovina allows every person over the age of 15 to apply for an ID card, and all citizens over the age of 18 must have the national ID card with them at all times. A penalty is issued if the citizen does not have the acquired ID card on them or if the citizen refuses to show proof of identification.

==== Kosovo ====
The Kosovo Identity Card is an ID card issued to the citizens of Kosovo for the purpose of establishing their identity, as well as serving as proof of residency, right to work and right to public benefits. It can be used instead of a passport for travel to some neighboring countries.

==== Moldova ====
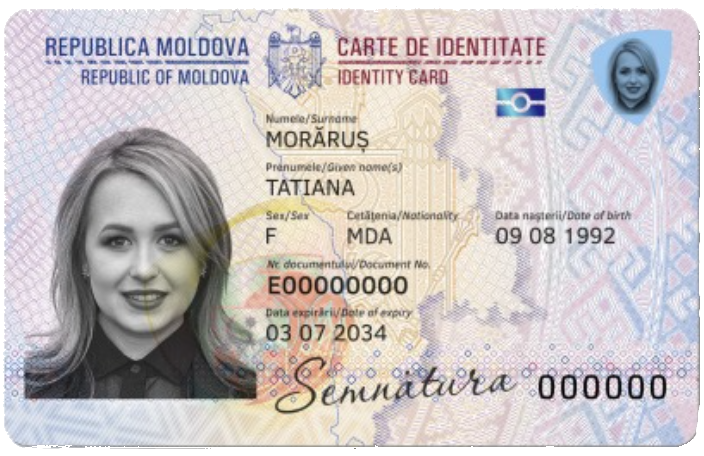
Moldovan identity card

In Moldova, identity cards (Romanian: Carte de identitate) have been issued since 1996. The first person to get identity card was former president of Moldova – Mircea Snegur. Since then, all the Moldovan citizens are required to have and use it inside the country. It cannot be used to travel outside the country; however, it is possible to pass the so-called Transnistrian border with it.

The Moldovan identity card may be obtained by a child from his/her date of birth. The state Public Services Agency is responsible for issuing identity cards and for storing data of all Moldovan citizens.

==== Monaco ====
Monégasque identity cards are issued to Monégasque citizens and can be used for travel within the Schengen Area.

==== Montenegro ====
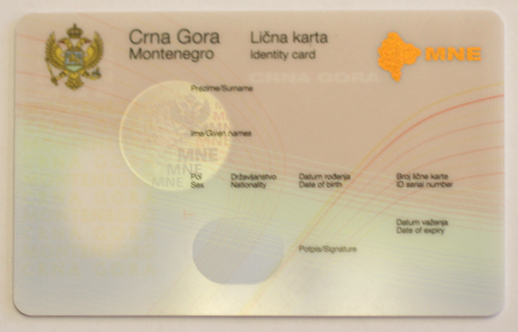
Montenegrin national ID card

In Montenegro every resident citizen over the age of 14 can have their Lična karta issued, and all persons over the age of 18 must have ID cards and carry them at all times when they are in public places. It can be used for international travel to Bosnia and Herzegovina, Serbia, North Macedonia, Kosovo and Albania instead of the passport.

==== North Macedonia ====
The identity card of North Macedonia

The identity card of North Macedonia (Macedonian: Лична карта, Lična karta) is a compulsory identity document issued in North Macedonia. The document is issued by the police on behalf of the Ministry of Interior. Every citizen over 18 must be issued this identity card.

==== Russia ====
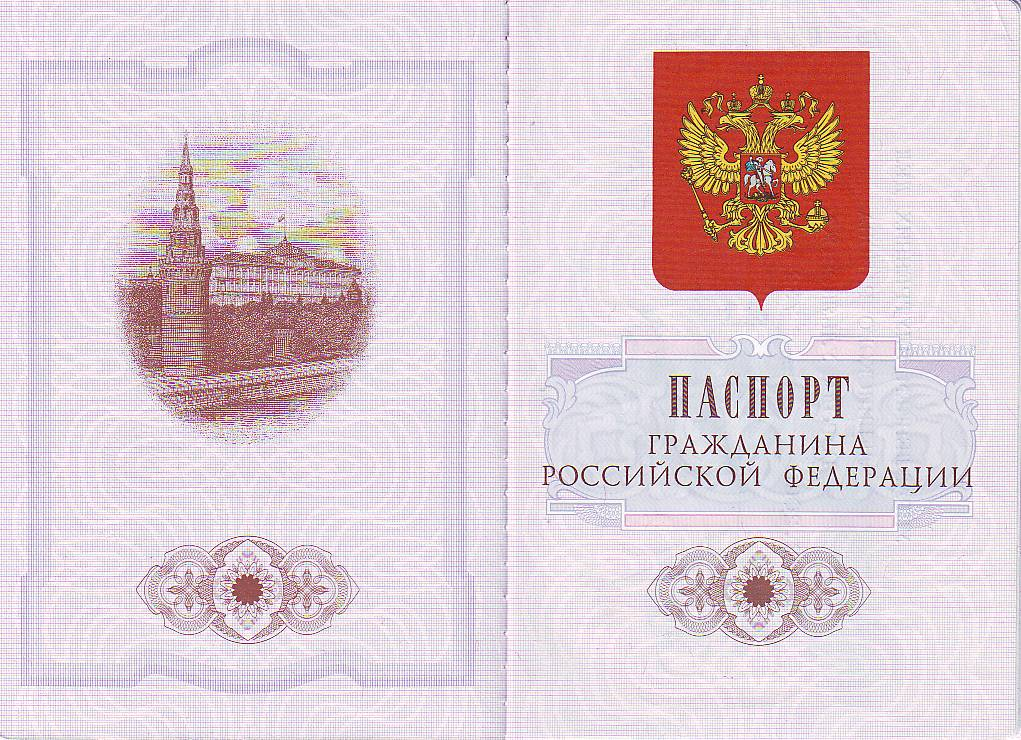
Russian internal passport, front

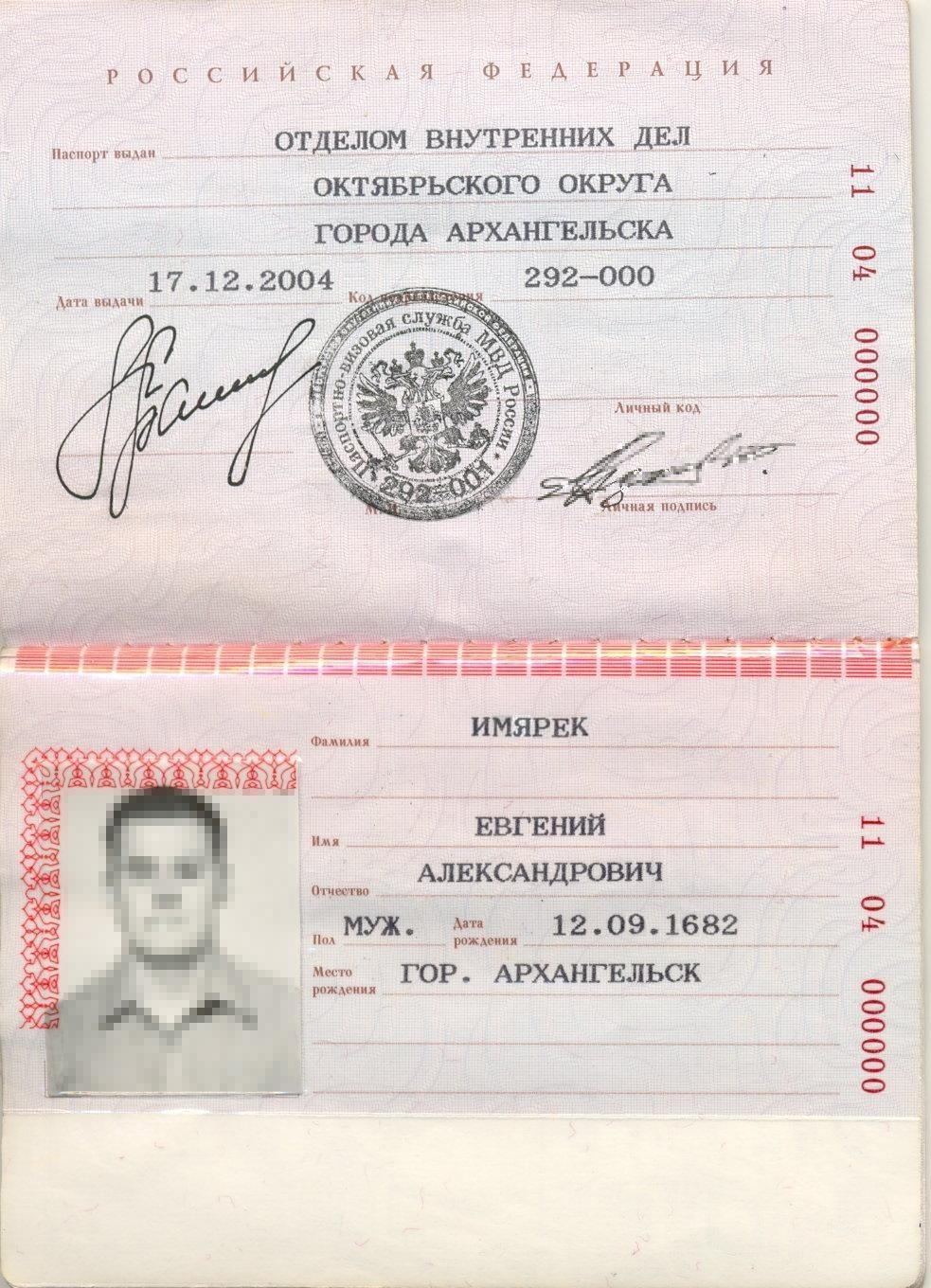
Russian internal passport: photo, dates and signature page

The role of identity documentation is primarily played by the so-called Russian internal passport, a passport-size booklet which contains a person's photograph, birth information and other data such as registration at the place of residence (informally known as propiska), marital data, information about military service and underage children. Internal passports are issued by the Main Directorate for Migration Affairs to all citizens who reach their 14th birthday and do not reside outside Russia. They are re-issued at the age 20 and 45.

The internal passport is commonly considered the only acceptable ID document in governmental offices, banks, while traveling by train or plane, getting a subscription service, etc. If the person does not have an internal passport (i.e., foreign nationals or Russian citizens who live abroad), an international passport can be accepted instead, theoretically in all cases. Another exception is army conscripts, who produce the Identity Card of the Russian Armed Forces.

Internal passports can also be used to travel to Belarus, Kazakhstan, Tajikistan, Kyrgyzstan, Abkhazia and South Ossetia.

Other documents, such as driver's licenses or student cards, can sometimes be accepted as ID, subject to regulations.

==== San Marino ====
The national identity card is compulsory for all Sanmarinese citizens. Biometric and valid for international travel since 2016.

==== Serbia ====
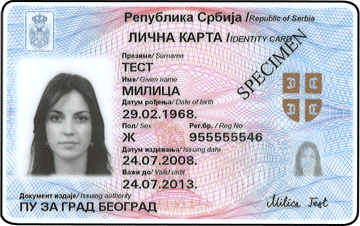
Serbian national ID card

In Serbia every resident citizen over the age of 10 can have their Lična karta issued, and all persons over the age of 16 must have ID cards and carry them at all times when they are in public places. It can be used for international travel to Bosnia and Herzegovina, Montenegro and Macedonia instead of the passport. Contact microchip on ID is optional.

Kosovo issues its own identity cards. These documents are accepted by Serbia when used as identification while crossing the Serbia-Kosovo border. They can also be used for international travel to Montenegro and Albania.

==== Ukraine ====
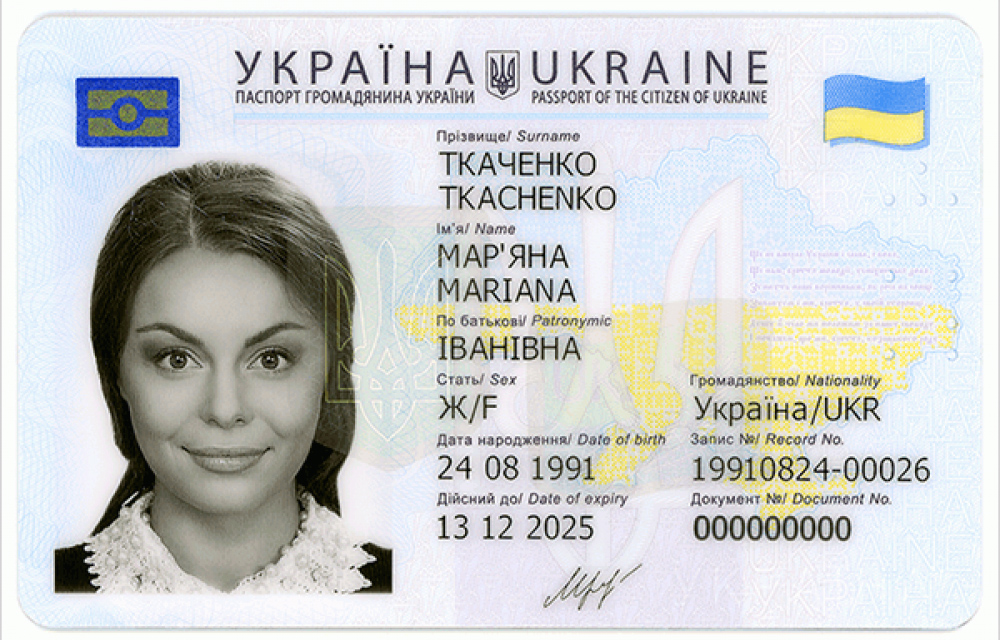
Ukrainian identity card

The Ukrainian identity card or Passport of the Citizen of Ukraine (also known as the Internal passport or Passport Card) is an identity document issued to citizens of Ukraine. Every Ukrainian citizen aged 14 or above and permanently residing in Ukraine must possess an identity card issued by local authorities of the State Migration Service of Ukraine.

Ukrainian identity cards are valid for 10 years (or 4 years, if issued for citizens aged 14 but less than 18) and afterwards must be exchanged for a new document.

==== United Kingdom ====
As of 2026 there is no UK identity document. A passport or driving licence is usually accepted as proof of identity, and a Voter Authority Certificate is available for voting in particular, but there is no obligation for a person to possess or carry proof of identity. Drivers need not carry a driving licence, but must provide one within 7 days if required by police. A UK Digital ID scheme was proposed on 25 September 2025, with a digital identity document for adult UK residents, intended to be mandatory for right to work checks and to discourage illegal migrant crossings in small boats across the English Channel.. However, the proposal was set to be cancelled after Andy Burnham became prime minister.

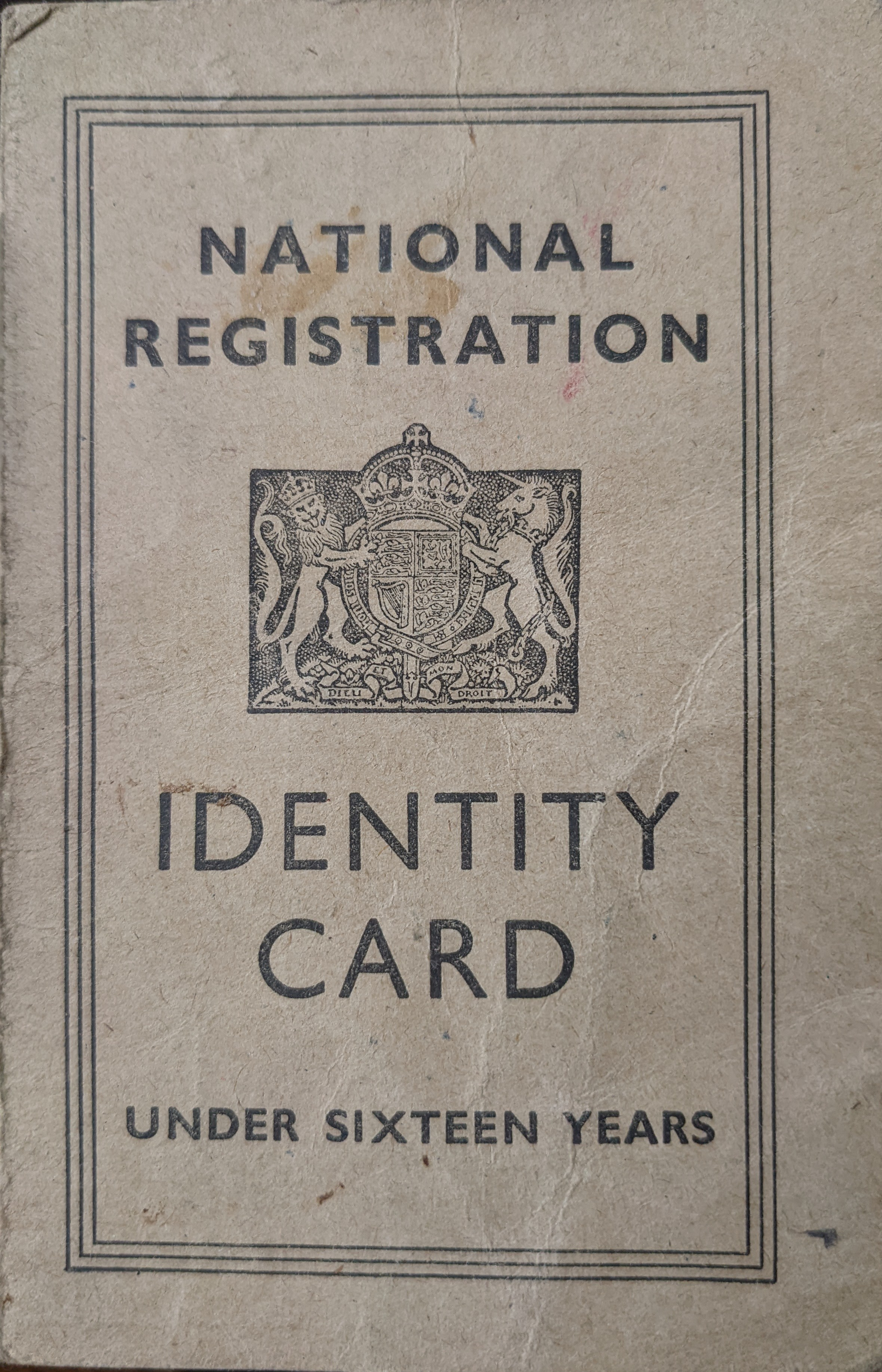
1946 UK child identity card

The UK had an identity card during World War II as part of a package of emergency powers; this was abolished in 1952 by repealing the National Registration Act 1939. Identity cards were first proposed in the mid-1980s for people attending football matches, following a series of high-profile hooliganism incidents involving English football fans. However, this proposed identity card scheme never went ahead as Lord Taylor of Gosforth ruled it out as "unworkable" in the Taylor Report of 1990.

The Identity Cards Act 2006 implemented a national ID scheme backed by a National Identity Register – an ambitious database linking a variety of data including Police, Health, Immigration, Electoral Rolls and other records. Several groups such as No2ID formed to campaign against ID cards in Britain and more importantly the NIR database, which was seen as a "panopticon" and a significant threat to civil liberties. The scheme saw setbacks after data were leaked on child benefit claimants in 2007, and from other high-profile databases, which turned public opinion against the government storing large, linked personal datasets.

Various partial rollouts were attempted such as compulsory identity cards for non-EU residents in Britain (starting late 2008), with voluntary registration for British nationals introduced in 2009 and mandatory registration proposed for certain high-security professions such as airport workers. However, the mandatory registrations met with resistance from unions such as the British Airline Pilots' Association.

After the 2010 general election a new coalition government was formed. Both parties had pledged to scrap ID cards in their election manifestos. The 2006 act was repealed by the Identity Documents Act 2010 which also required that the nascent NIR database be destroyed. The Home Office announced that the national identity register had been destroyed on February 10, 2011. Prior to the 2006 Act, work had started to update British passports with RFID chips to support the use of ePassport gates. This continued, with traditional passports being replaced with RFID versions on renewal.

Driving licences, particularly the photocard driving licence introduced in 1998, and passports are widely used as proof of identity. Driving licences from the UK and EU countries are usually accepted within EU and EFTA countries for identity verification. Most people do not carry their passports in public; consequently, driving licences, when held, are the most common and convenient form of ID in use, along with PASS-accredited cards, used mainly for proof-of-age purposes. Unlike a travel document, they do not show the holder's nationality or immigration status. To prove age, as required for some purposes, an easily obtained provisional driving license can be used.

===== Gibraltar =====
Gibraltar has operated an identity card system since 1943.

The cards issued were originally folded cardboard, similar to the wartime UK Identity cards abolished in 1950. There were different colours for British and non-British residents. Gibraltar requires all residents to hold identity cards, which are issued free.

In 1993 the cardboard ID card was replaced with a laminated version. However, although valid as a travel document to the UK, they were not accepted by Spain.

A new version in an EU-compliant format was issued and is valid for use throughout the EU, although as very few are seen, there are sometimes problems when used, even in the UK. ID cards are needed for some financial transactions, but apart from that and to cross the frontier with Spain, they are not in common use.

== North America ==
=== Belize ===
Called the "Identification Card R.R". Optional, although compulsory for voting and other government transactions. Available also for any Commonwealth country citizen who has lived in Belize for a year without leaving and been at least 2 months in an area where the person has been registered in.

=== Canada ===
In Canada, different forms of identification documentation are used, but there is no de jure national identity card. The Canadian passport is issued by the federal (national) government, and the provinces and territories issue various documents which can be used for identification purposes. The most commonly used forms of identification within Canada are the health card and driver's licence issued by provincial and territorial governments. The widespread usage of these two documents for identification purposes has made them de facto identity cards.

In Canada, a driver's license usually lists the name, home address, height and date of birth of the bearer. A photograph of the bearer is usually present, as well as additional information, such as restrictions to the bearer's driving licence. The bearer is required by law to keep the address up to date.

A few provinces, such as Québec and Ontario, issue provincial health care cards which contain identification information, such as a photo of the bearer, their home address, and their date of birth. British Columbia, Saskatchewan and Ontario are among the provinces that produce photo identification cards for individuals who do not possess a driving licence, with the cards containing the bearer's photo, home address, and date of birth.

For travel abroad, a passport is almost always required. There are a few minor exceptions to this rule; required documentation to travel among North American countries is subject to the Western Hemisphere Travel Initiative, such as the NEXUS programme and the Enhanced Drivers License programme implemented by a few provincial governments as a pilot project. These programmes have not yet gained widespread acceptance, and the Canadian passport remains the most useful and widely accepted international travel document.

=== Cayman Islands ===
Optional and not fully launched. Legislation was enacted in 2022.

=== Costa Rica ===
Every Costa Rican citizen must carry an identity card immediately after turning 18. The card is named Cédula de Identidad and it is issued by the local registrar's office (Registro Civil), an office belonging to the local elections committee (Tribunal Supremo de Elecciones), which in Costa Rica has the same rank as the Supreme Court. Each card has a unique number composed of nine numerical digits, the first of them being the province where the citizen was born (with other significance in special cases such as granted citizenship to foreigners, adopted persons, or in rare cases, old people for whom no birth certificate was processed at birth). After this digit, two blocks of four digits follow; the combination corresponds to the unique identifier of the citizen.

It is widely requested as part of every legal and financial purpose, often requested at payment with credit or debit cards for identification guarantee and requested for buying alcoholic beverages or cigarettes or upon entrance to adults-only places like bars.

The card must be renewed every ten years and is freely issued again if lost. Among the information included there are, on the front, two identification pictures and digitized signature of the owner, identification number (known colloquially just as the cédula), first name, first and second-last names and an optional known as field. On the back, there is again the identification number, birth date, where the citizen issues its vote for national elections or referendums, birthplace, gender, date when it must be renewed and a matrix code that includes all this information and even a digitized fingerprint of the thumb and index finger.

The matrix code is not currently being used nor inspected by any kind of scanner.

Besides this identification card, every vehicle driver must carry a driving licence, an additional card that uses the same identification number as the ID card (Cédula de Identidad) for the driving license number. A passport is also issued with the same identification number used in the ID card. The same situation occurs with the Social Security number; it is the same number used for the ID card.

All non-Costa Rican citizens with a resident status must carry an ID card (Cédula de Residencia), otherwise, a passport and a valid visa. Each resident's ID card has a unique number composed of 12 digits; the first three of them indicate their nationality and the rest of them a sequence used by the immigration authority (called Dirección General de Migración y Extranjería). As with the Costa Rican citizens, their Social Security number and their driver's license (if they have it) would use the same number as in their own resident's ID card.

=== Dominican Republic ===
A "Cédula de Identidad y Electoral" (Identity and Voting Document) is a National ID that is also used for voting in both Presidential and Congressional ballots. Each "Cédula de Identidad y Electoral" has its unique serial number composed by the serial of the municipality of current residence, a sequential number plus a verification digit. This National ID card is issued to all legal residents of adult age. It is usually required to validate job applications, legally binding contracts, official documents, buying/selling real estate, opening a personal bank account, obtaining a Driver's License and the like. It is issued free of charge by the "Junta Central Electoral" (Central Voting Committee) to all Dominicans not living abroad at the time of reaching adulthood (16 years of age) or younger is they are legally emancipated. Foreigners who have taken permanent residence and have not yet applied for Dominican naturalization (i.e., have not opted for Dominican citizenship but have taken permanent residence) are required to pay an issuing tariff and must bring along their non-expired Country of Origin passport and deposit photocopies of their Residential Card and Dominican Red Cross Blood Type card. Foreigners residing on a permanent basis must renew their "Foreign ID" on a 2-, 4-, or 10-year renewal basis (about US$63–US$240, depending on desired renewal period).

=== El Salvador ===
In El Salvador, ID Card is called Documento Único de Identidad (DUI) (Unique Identity Document). Every citizen above 18 years must carry this ID for identification purposes at any time. It is not based on a smartcard but on a standard plastic card with two-dimensional bar-coded information with picture and signature.

=== Guatemala ===
In January 2009, the National Registry of Persons (RENAP) in Guatemala began offering a new identity document in place of the Cédula de Vecindad (neighborhood identity document) to all Guatemala citizens and foreigners. The new document is called "Documento Personal de Identification" (DPI) (Personal Identity Document). It is based on a smartcard with a chip and includes an electronic signature and several measures against fraud.

=== Jamaica ===
Optional, although compulsory for voting and other government transactions. Since 2022 a brand new biometric National ID Card has been unveiled, free of charge for Jamaican citizens.

=== Mexico ===
Not mandatory, but needed in almost all official documents, the CURP is the standardized version of an identity document. It actually could be a printed green wallet-sized card (without a photo) or simply an 18-character identification key printed on a birth or death certificate.

While Mexico has a national identity card (cédula de identitad personal), it is only issued to children aged 4–17.

Unlike most other countries, Mexico has assigned a CURP to nearly all minors, since both the government and most private schools ask parent(s) to supply their children's CURP to keep a data base of all the children. Also, minors must produce their CURP when applying for a passport or being registered at Public Health services by their parent(s).

Most adults need the CURP code too, since it is required for almost all governmental paperwork like tax filings and passport applications. Most companies ask for a prospective employee's CURP, voting card, or passport rather than birth certificates.

To have a CURP issued for a person, a birth certificate or similar proof must be presented to the issuing authorities to prove that the information supplied on the application is true. Foreigners applying for a CURP must produce a certificate of legal residence in Mexico. Foreign-born naturalized Mexican citizens must present their naturalization certificate. On August 21, 2008, the Mexican cabinet passed the National Security Act, which compels all Mexican citizens to have a biometric identity card, called Citizen Identity Card (Cédula de identidad ciudadana) before 2011.

On February 13, 2009, the Mexican government designated the state of Tamaulipas to start procedures for issuing a pilot program of the national Mexican ID card.

Although the CURP is the de jure official identification document in Mexico, the Instituto Nacional Electoral's Voter Credential card is the de facto official identification and proof of legal age for citizens of ages 18 and older.

On July 28, 2009, Mexican President Felipe Calderón, facing the Mexican House of Representatives, announced the launch of the Mexican national Identity card project, which will see the first card issued before the end of 2009.

=== Panama ===
The cédula de identidad personal is required at age 12 (cedula juvenil) and age 18. Panamanian citizens must carry their cédula at all times. New biometric national identity cards rolled out in 2019. The card must be renewed every 10 years (every 5 years for those under 18), and it can only be replaced 3 times (with each replacement costing more than the previous one) without requiring a background check, to confirm and verify that the card holder is not selling his or her identity to third parties for human trafficking or other criminal activities. All cards have QR, PDF417, and Code 128 barcodes. The QR code holds all printed (on the front of the card) text information about the card holder, while the PDF417 barcode holds, in JPEG format encoded with Base64, an image of the fingerprint of the left index finger of the card holder. Panamanian biometric/electronic/machine readable ID cards are similar to biometric passports and current European/Czech national ID cards and have only a small PDF417 barcode, with a machine readable area, a contactless smart card RFID chip, and golden contact pads similar to those found in smart card credit cards and SIM cards. The machine-readable code contains all printed text information about the card holder (it replaces the QR code) while both chips (the smart card chip is hidden under the golden contact pads) contain all personal information about the card holder along with a JPEG photo of the card holder, a JPEG photo with the card holder's signature, and another JPEG photo but with all 10 fingerprints of both hands of the card holder. Earlier cards used Code 16K and Code 49 barcodes with magnetic stripes.

=== United States ===
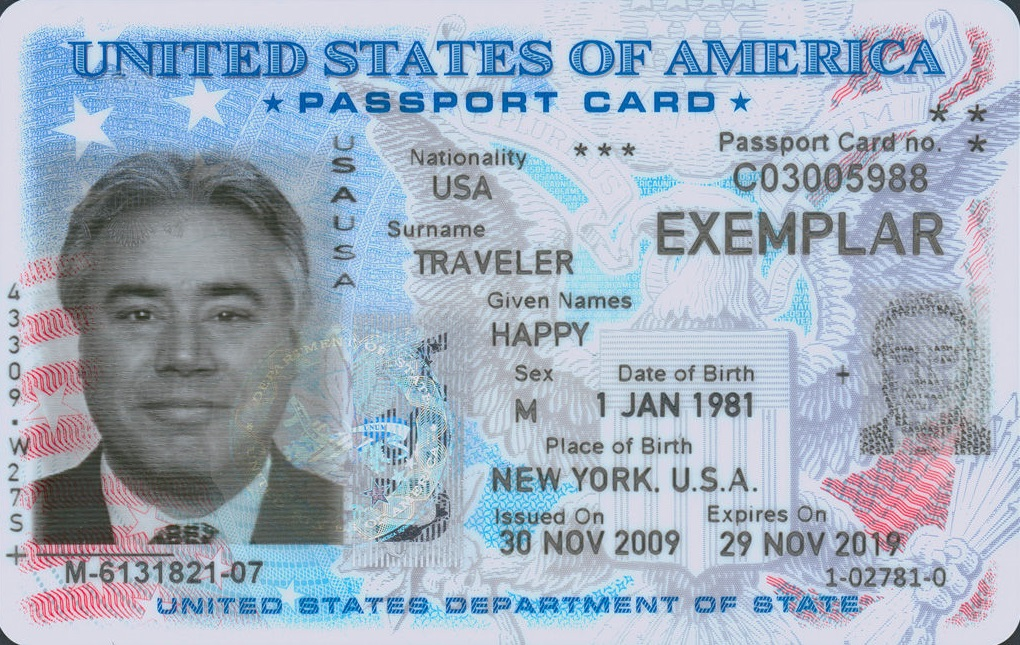
US passport card (front)

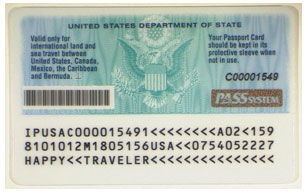
US passport card (back)

There is no compulsory federal-level ID card that is issued to all U.S. citizens. U.S. citizens and nationals may obtain passports or U.S. passport cards if they choose to, but this is optional and other alternatives are more popular.

For most people, driver's licenses issued by the respective state and territorial governments have become the de facto identity cards, and are used for many identification purposes, such as when purchasing alcohol and tobacco, opening bank accounts, and boarding planes, along with confirming a voter's identity in states with voter photo identification laws. Individuals who do not drive can obtain an identification card with the same functions from the state agency that issues driver's licenses. In addition, many schools issue student and teacher ID cards.

The United States passed the REAL ID Act on May 11, 2005. The bill requires states to redesign their driver's licenses to comply with federal security standards by December 2009. Federal agencies would then reject licenses or identity cards that do not comply, which would force Americans accessing everything from airplanes to courthouses to have federally mandated cards. At airports, those not having compliant licenses or cards would be redirected to a secondary screening location. As of 2024, every state has implemented some ID that satisfies the standard.

In 2006, the U.S. State Department studied the idea of issuing passports with radio-frequency identification, or RFID, chips embedded in them.

The United States passport verifies both personal identity and citizenship, but is not mandatory for citizens to possess within the country and is issued by the U.S. State Department on a discretionary basis.

Since February 1, 2008, U.S. citizens may apply for passport cards, in addition to the usual passport books. Although their main purpose is for land and sea travel within North America, the passport card may also be accepted by federal authorities (such as for domestic air travel or entering federal buildings). The Transportation Security Administration (TSA) accepts the passport card as an identity document at airport security checkpoints.

U.S. Citizenship and Immigration Services allows the U.S. passport card to be used in the Employment Eligibility Verification Form I-9 (form) process. The passport card is considered a "List A" document that may be presented by newly hired employees during the employment eligibility verification process to show work authorized status. "List A" documents are those used by employees to prove both identity and work authorization when completing the Form I-9.

The basic document needed to establish a person's identity and citizenship in order to obtain a passport is a birth certificate. These are issued by either the U.S. state of birth or by the U.S. Department of State for overseas births to U.S. citizens. A child born in the U.S. is in nearly all cases (except for children of foreign diplomats) automatically a U.S. citizen. The parents of a child born overseas to U.S. citizens can report the birth to the U.S. embassy/consulate to obtain a Consular Report of Birth Abroad.

Social Security numbers (SSNs) and cards are issued by the U.S. Social Security Administration for tracking Social Security taxes and benefits. They have become the de facto national identification number for federal and state taxation, private financial services, and identification with various companies. SSNs do not establish citizenship because they can also be issued to permanent residents. They typically can only be part of the establishment of a person's identity; a photo ID that verifies date of birth is also usually requested.

A mix of documents can be presented to, for instance, verify one's legal eligibility to take a job within the United States. Identity and citizenship is established by presenting a passport alone, but this must be accompanied by a Social Security card for taxation ID purposes. A driver's license/state ID establishes identity alone, but does not establish citizenship, as these can be provided to non-citizens as well. In this case, an applicant without a passport may sign an affidavit of citizenship or be required to present a birth certificate. They must also submit their Social Security number.

"Residency" within a certain U.S. jurisdiction, such as a voting precinct, can be proven if the driver's license or state ID has the home address printed on it corresponding to that jurisdiction. Utility bills or other pieces of official printed mail can also suffice for this purpose. In the case of voter registration, citizenship must also be proven with a passport, birth certificate, or signed citizenship affidavit.

The Selective Service System has in the past, in times of a military draft, issued an identification card for men that were eligible for the draft.

== Oceania ==
=== Australia ===
Australia does not have a national identity card. Instead, various identity documents are used or required to prove a person's identity, whether for government or commercial purposes.

Currently, driver licences and photo cards, both issued by the states and territories, are the most widely used personal identification documents in Australia. Additionally, the Australia Post Keypass identity card, issued by Australia Post, can be used by people who do not have an Australian drivers licence or an Australian state and territory issued identity photo card.

Photo cards are also called "Proof of Age Cards" or similar and can be issued to people as another type of identity. Identification indicating age is commonly required to purchase alcohol and tobacco and to enter nightclubs and gambling venues.

Other important identity documents include a passport, an official birth certificate, an official marriage certificate, cards issued by government agencies (typically social security cards), some cards issued by commercial organisations (e.g., a debit or credit card), and utility accounts. Often, some combination of identity documents is required, such as an identity document linking a name, photograph and signature (typically photo-ID in the form of a driver licence or passport), evidence of operating in the community, and evidence of a current residential address.

New alcohol laws in the state of Queensland require some Brisbane-based pubs and bars to scan ID documents against a database of people who should be denied alcohol, for which foreign passports and driver's licences are not valid.

=== Marshall Islands ===
An "Identification Card" seems to exists among citizens of the Marshall Islands, but little information is found on these documents.

=== Micronesia ===
National Identity cards, called "FSM Voters National Identity card", are issued on an optional basis, free of charge. The Identity Cards were introduced in 2005.

=== New Zealand ===
New Zealand does not have an official ID card. The most commonly carried form of identification is a driver licence issued by the Transport Agency.

Other forms of special purpose identification documents are issued by different government departments, for example a Firearms Licence issued to gun owners by the Police and the SuperGold card issued to elderly people by the Ministry of Social Development.

For purchasing alcohol or tobacco, the only legal forms of identification is a New Zealand or foreign passport, a New Zealand driver licences and a Kiwi Access Card (formerly known as 18+ cards) from the Hospitality Association of New Zealand. Overseas driver licences are not legal for this purpose.

For opening a bank account, each bank has its own list of documents that it will accept. Generally speaking, banks accept a foreign or NZ passport, a NZ Firearms Licence, or a foreign ID card by itself. If the customer do not have these documents, they will need to produce two different documents on the approved list (for example a driver licence and a marriage certificate).

=== Palau ===
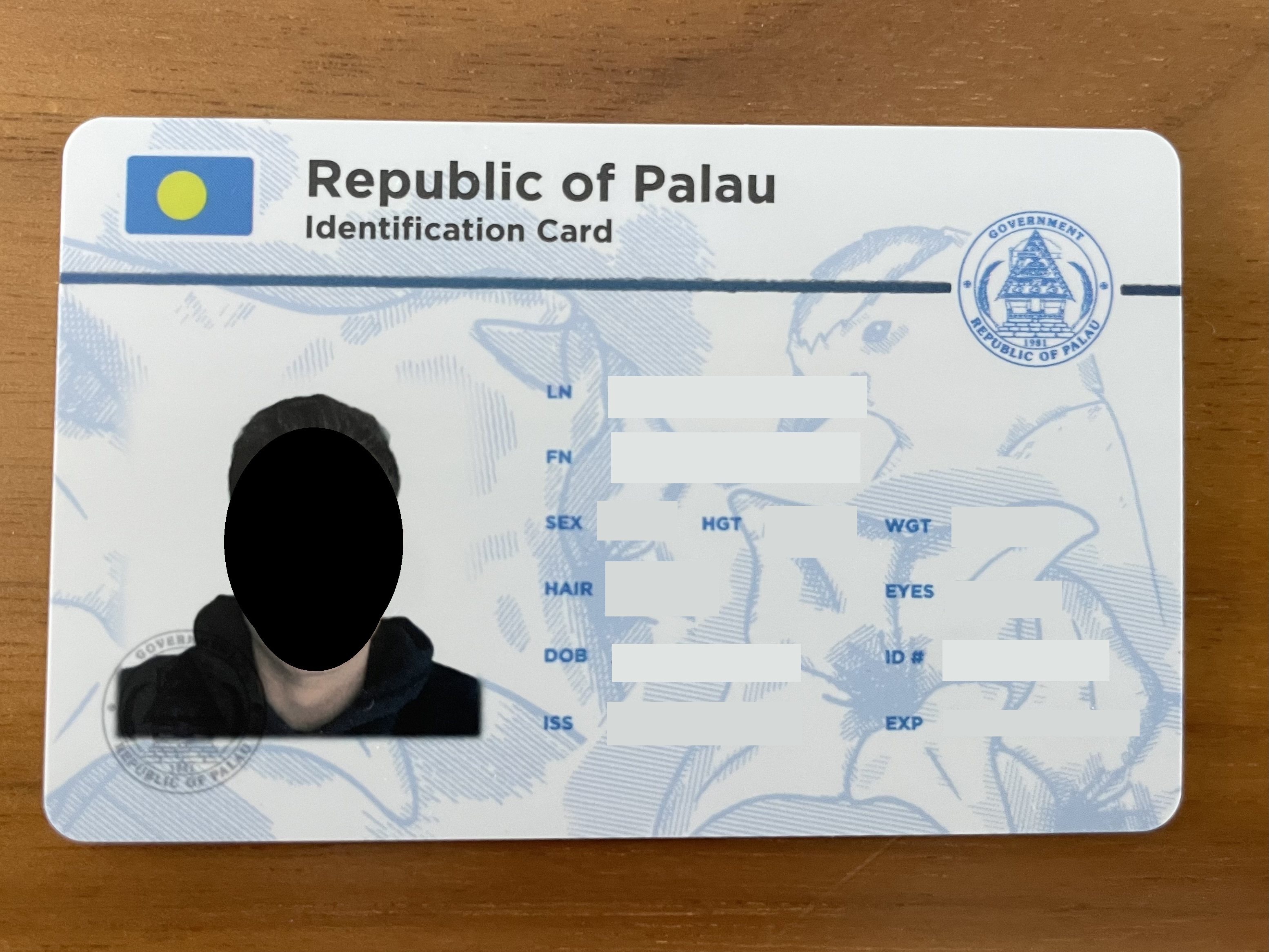
Republic of Palau Identification Card (front)

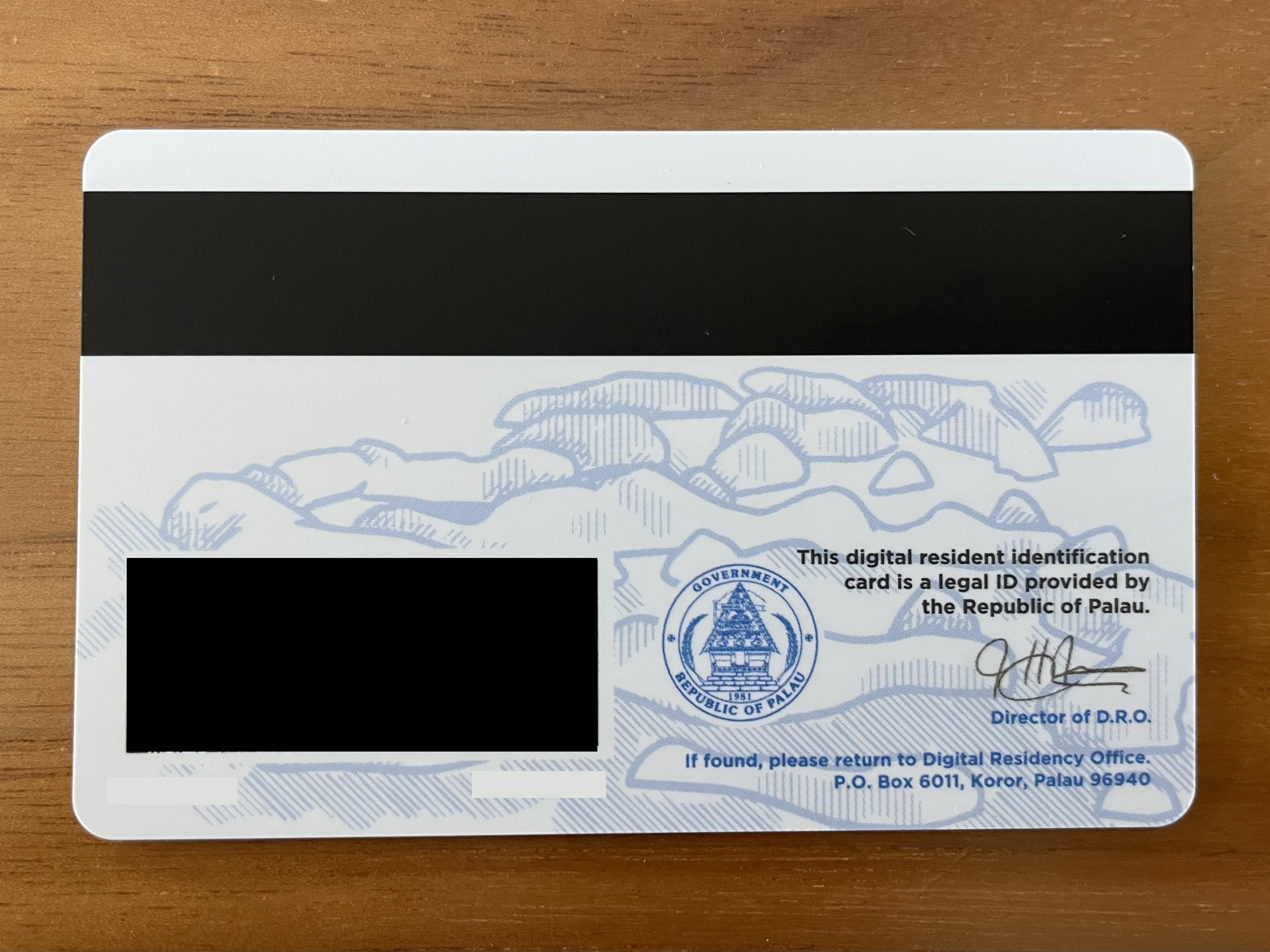
Republic of Palau Identification Card (rear)

Republic of Palau Identification Cards are primarily issued to foreign nationals whom are not eligible to acquire a Palau passport or driver's license, under the Digital Residency Act. Foreign nationals are required to undergo a sanctions check.

=== Papua New Guinea ===
E-National ID cards were rolled out in 2015.

=== Solomon Islands ===
"National Voter's Identity card" are optional upon request.

=== Tonga ===
Tonga's National ID Card was first issued in 2010, and it is optional, along with the driver's licenses and passports. Either one of these are mandatory for to vote though. Applicants need to be 14 years of age or older to apply for a National ID Card.

=== Vanuatu ===
National Identity Cards are being issued since October 2017. Plans for rolling out biometric cards were due for the late 2018.

== South America ==
=== Argentina ===
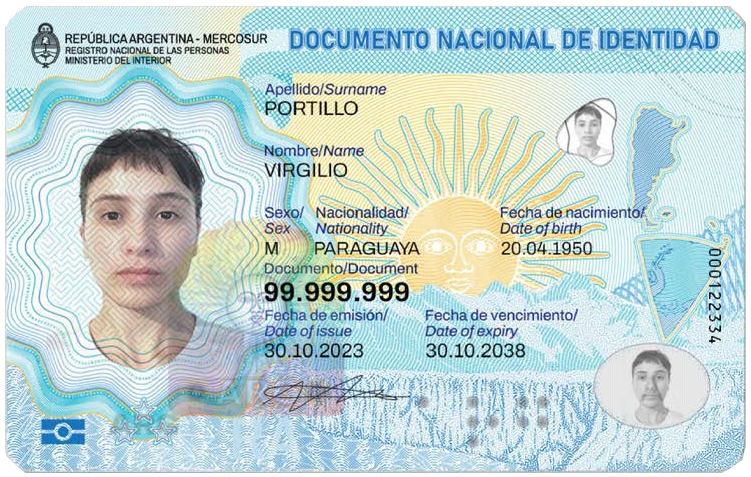
Current front side of Argentine DNI Card

Documento Nacional de Identidad (DNI; "National Identity Document") is the main identity document for Argentine residents. It is issued as a card (tarjeta DNI) at birth to all people born in the country (and hence citizens), and to foreigners who register as residents with the National Directorate of Migrations. It must be updated at 8 and 14 years of age, and thereafter every 15 years. The documents are produced at a special plant in Buenos Aires by the Argentine national registry of people (ReNaPer). The National Identity Document (DNI) is the sole instrument for personal identification and is mandatory. Its format and use are regulated by Law No. 17671 on Identification, Registration, and Classification of the National Human Potential, enacted in 1968, replacing the enrolment document issued to men undergoing mandatory military service and libreta cívica given to women upon turning 18.

According to this law, the DNI cannot be substituted by any other document for legal purposes. It is required for voting, which is mandatory, and for identification before judicial authorities. The Argentine DNI is also required for conducting procedures with state authorities, and entitles adult bearers to work within the country.

From November 4, 2009, as part of a modernization and digitization process of national documents, a new type of DNI with both a booklet and a card was issued; either may be used for most purposes, but the booklet had to be used for voting.

The DNI booklet had a light blue cover with laser printing for the citizen's unique number and silver prints for the rest of the presentation. Internally, it had an identical design to the card format but included spaces for marital status, address changes, organ donations, and the stamping of the DNI after voting in national elections. The card was entirely laminated and contained all the individual's data, including a photograph and fingerprint impression.

From 2011, the DNI underwent further changes, with no booklet and a different card design, a higher-quality plastic card to be used for all purposes. The booklet was no longer required for voting by holders of the still-valid 2009 version. Since April 1, 2017, the DNI card is the only valid identification document. Taxpayers also have a Unique Tax Identification Code (CUIT).

In December 2023, the National Registry of Persons of Argentina (Renaper), a subsidiary of the Ministry of the Interior, introduced the Biometric National Identity Document (DNI). It adheres to international standards of security, with an embedded electronic chip and a QR code for electronic validation, identity verification, digital functions, and advanced security measures.

Manufactured using laser technology on polycarbonate, a durable material, the new document has up-to-date physical security features to enhance visual verification and prevent counterfeiting.

=== Brazil ===
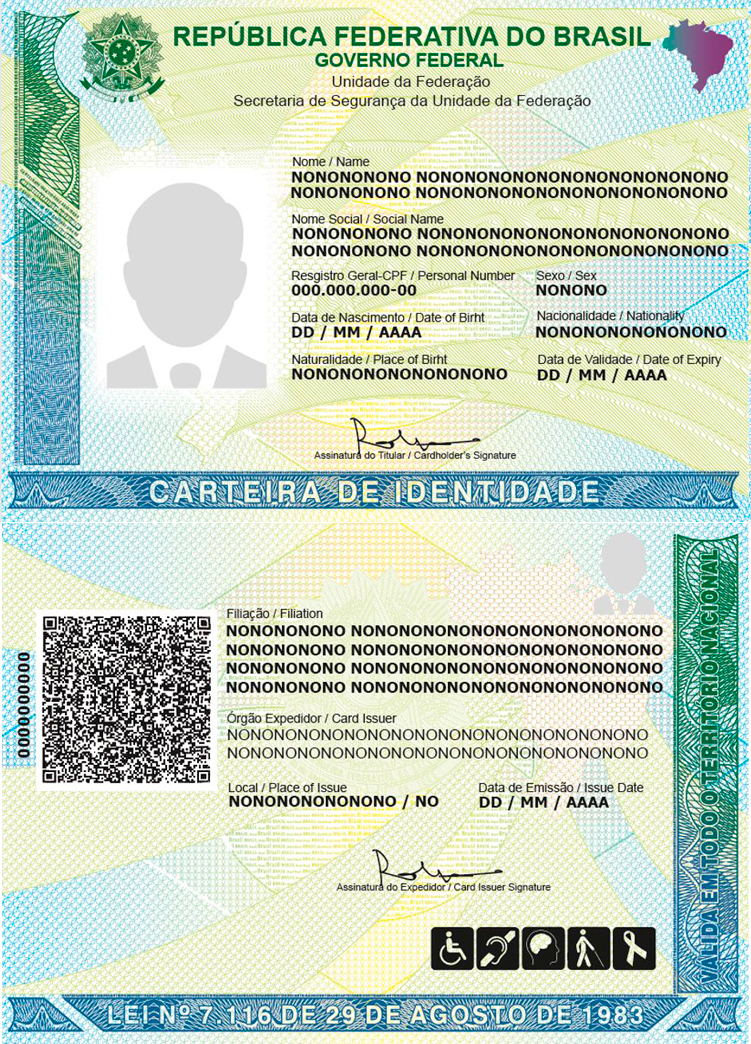
Model of the Brazilian identity card, as of 2023

In Brazil, at the age of 18, all Brazilian citizens are supposed to be issued a cédula de identidade (ID card), usually known by its number, the Registro Geral (RG), Portuguese for "General Registry". The cards are needed to obtain a job, to vote, and to use credit cards. Foreigners living in Brazil have a different kind of ID card. Since the RG is not unique, being issued in a state-basis, in many places the CPF (the Brazilian revenue agency's identification number) is used as a replacement. The current Brazilian driver's license contains both the RG and the CPF, and as such can be used as an identification card as well.

With the new Carteira Nacional de Identificação (National Identification Card), all of other document numbers (RG, driver's license, SUS card, voting ID, social security number, birth certificate, worker's ID) were unified and linked to the CPF number. The new document also has a digital version via Gov.br mobile app. Old ID cards are still valid until 28 February 2032, when only the new IDs will be accepted as valid ID documents.

=== Colombia ===
Upon turning 18 every resident in Colombia must obtain an identity document (Spanish: Cédula de Ciudadanía or Documento de Identidad), which is the only document that proves the identity of a person for legal purposes. ID cards must be carried at all times and must be presented to the police upon request. If the individual fails to present the ID card upon request by the police or the military, he/she is most likely going to be detained at police station even if he/she is not a suspect of any wrongdoing. ID cards are needed to obtain employment, open bank accounts, obtain a passport, driver's license, military card, to enroll in educational institutions, vote or enter public buildings including airports and courthouses; failure to produce ID is a misdemeanor punishable with a fine. ID duplicate costs must be assumed by citizens. Every resident over the age of 14 is issued an identity card called (Tarjeta de Identidad)

=== Chile ===
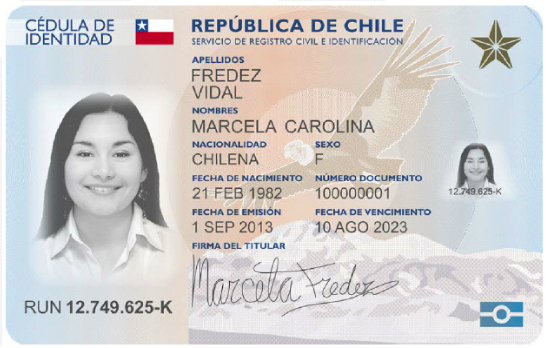
Chilean Cédula de Identidad

Every resident of Chile over the age of 18 must have and carry at all times their ID Card called Cédula de Identidad issued by the Civil Registry and Identification Service of Chile.

The identity card is the official document that proves the identity of a Chilean person. Among the data it contains is the full name, Unique National Role (RUN) and sex, in addition to the photo, signature and fingerprint. Anyone who wants their profession to appear on their identity card must be registered in the professional registry.

This is the only official form of identification for residents in Chile and is widely used and accepted as such. It is necessary for every contract, most bank transactions, voting, driving (along with the driver's licence) and other public and private situations. Biometrics collection is mandatory.

=== Peru ===
In Peru, it is mandatory for all citizens over the age of 18, whether born inside or outside the territory of the Republic, to obtain a National Identity Document (Documento Nacional de Identidad). The DNI is a public, personal and untransferable document.

The DNI is the only means of identification permitted for participating in any civil, legal, commercial, administrative, and judicial acts. It is also required for voting and must be presented to authorities upon request. The DNI can be used as a passport to travel to all South American countries that are members of UNASUR.

The DNI is issued by the National Registry of Identification and Civil Status (RENIEC). For Peruvians abroad, service is provided through the Consulates of Peru, in accordance with Articles 26, 31 and 8 of Law No. 26,497.

The document is card-sized as defined by ISO format ID-1 (prior to 2005 the DNI was size ISO ID-2; renewal of the card due to the size change was not mandatory, nor did previously-emitted cards lose validity). The front of the card presents photographs of the holder's face, their name, date and place of birth (the latter in coded form), gender and marital status; the bottom quarter consists of machine-readable text. Three dates are listed as well; the date the citizen was first registered at RENIEC; the date the document was issued; and the expiration date of the document. The back of the DNI features the holder's address (including district, department and/or province) and voting group. Eight voting record blocks are successively covered with metallic labels when the citizen presents themselves at their voting group on voting days. The back also denotes whether the holder is an organ donor, presents the holder's right index finger print, a PDF417 bar code, and a 1D bar code.

=== Uruguay ===
In Uruguay, the identity card (documento de identidad) is issued by the Ministry of the Interior and the National Civil Identification Bureau (Dirección Nacional de Identificación Civil | DNIC).

It is mandatory and essential for several activities at either governmental or private levels. The document is mandatory for all inhabitants of the Oriental Republic of Uruguay, whether they are native citizens, legal citizens, or resident aliens in the country, even for children as young as 45 days old.

It is a laminated card 9 cm (3.5 in) wide and approximately 5 cm (2.0 in) high, dominated by the color blue, showing the flag in the background with the photo of the owner, the number assigned by the DNIC (including a self-generated or check digit), full name, and the corresponding signature along with biometrics. The card is bilingual in Spanish and Portuguese.

Identity cards are required for most formal transactions, from credit card purchases to any identity validation, proof of age, and so on. The identity card is not to be confused with the Credencial Cívica, which is used exclusively for voting.

=== Venezuela ===
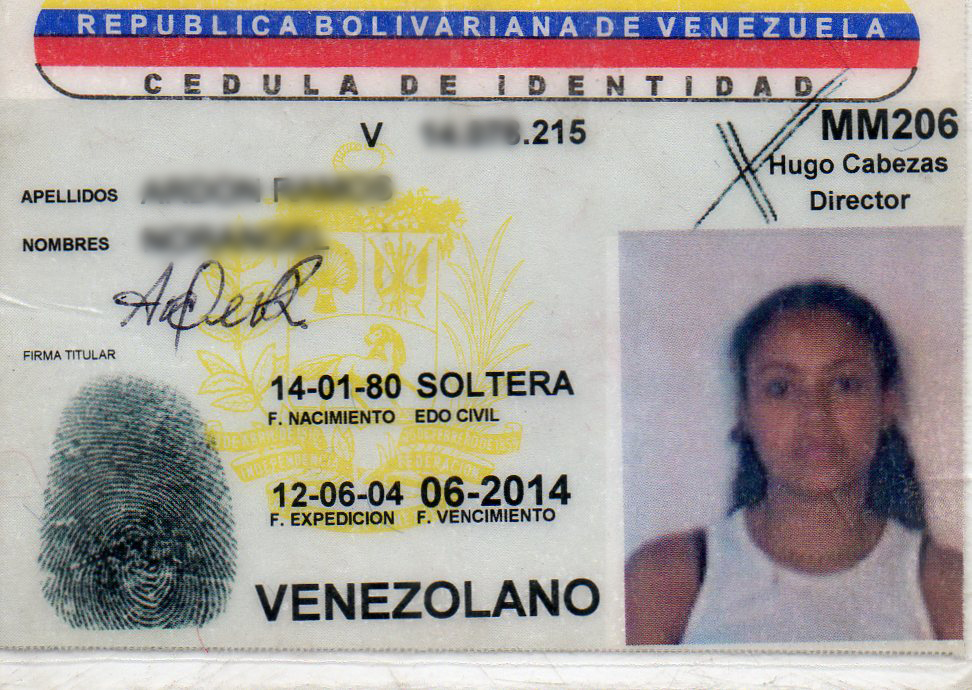
Current ID card issued by the government of Venezuela

Identity cards in Venezuela consist of a plastic-laminated paper which contains the national ID number (Cédula de Identidad) as well as a color-photo and the last names, given names, date of birth, right thumb print, signature, and marital status (single, married, divorced, widowed) of the bearer. It also contains the documents expedition and expiration date. Two different prefixes can be found before the ID number: "V" for Venezuelans and "E" for foreigners (extranjeros in Spanish). This distinction is also shown in the document at the very bottom by a bold all-caps typeface displaying either the word VENEZOLANO or EXTRANJERO, respectively.

Despite Venezuela being the second country in the Americas (after the United States) to adopt a biometric passport, the current Venezuelan ID document is remarkably low-security, even for regional standards. It can hardly be called a card. The paper inside the laminated cover contains only two security measures, first, it is a special type of government-issued paper, and second, it has microfilaments in the paper that glow in the presence of UV light. The laminated cover itself is very simplistic and quite large for the paper it covers and the photo, although is standard sized (3x3.5 cm) is rather blurred. Government officials in charge of issuing the document openly recommend each individual to cut the excess plastic off and re-laminate the document in order to protect it from bending. The requirements for getting a Venezuelan identity document are quite relaxed and Venezuela lacks high-security in its birth certificates and other documents that give claim to citizenship.

== See also ==
- National identification number
- Access badge
- Anthropometry
- National biometric id card
- Campus card
- Homeland card
- Home Return Permit
- ID card printer
- Identity Cards Act 2006
- List of identity card policies by country
- Magnetic stripe card
- NO2ID
- Pass laws
- Physical security
- Police certificate
- Proximity card
- Self-sovereign identity
- Warrant card
