= Visa requirements for Irish citizens =

Administrative entry restrictions

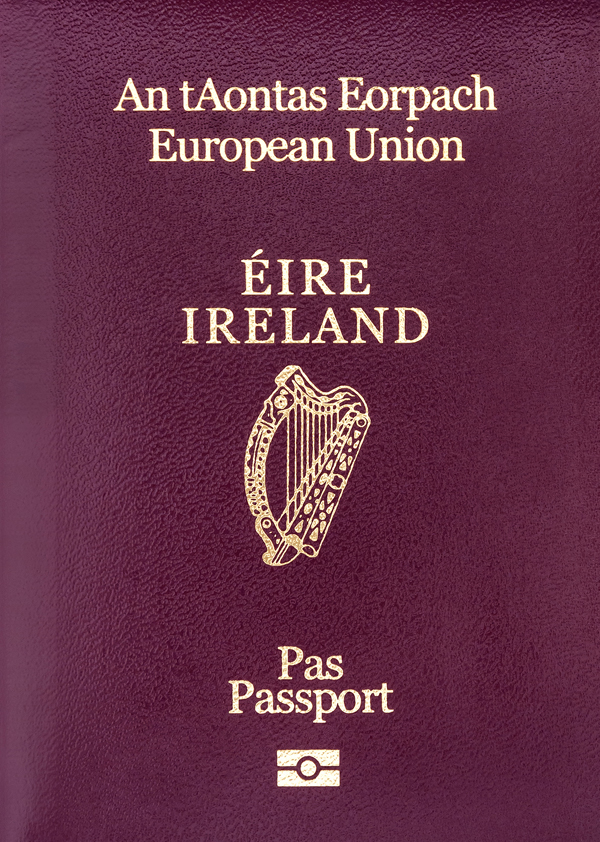
Front cover of an Irish passport

As of 2026, Irish citizens have visa-free or visa on arrival access to 185 countries and territories. Globally, the Irish passport ranks fourth according to the Henley Passport Index.

== Visa requirements map ==
Visa requirements for Irish citizens holding ordinary passports Ireland Freedom of movement (European Union / European Economic Area / Common Travel Area) Visa not required / ESTA / eTA / eVisitor Visa on arrival eVisa Visa available both on arrival or online Visa required

== Visa requirements ==
Country	Visa requirement	Allowed stay	Notes (excluding departure fees)	Reciprocity
Afghanistan	eVisa		The Irish government advises its citizens not to travel to Afghanistan due to the extremely volatile security situation in the country.; Visa is not required in case born in Afghanistan or can proof that one of their parents is a national of Afghanistan or born in Afghanistan.; e-Visa : Visitors must arrive at Kabul International (KBL).	✓
Albania	Visa not required	90 days	Passport card valid.	X
Algeria	Visa required			✓
Andorra	Visa not required		Passport card valid.	✓
Angola	Visa not required	30 days	30 days per trip, but no more than 90 days within any 1 calendar year for tourism purposes only.; Visitors must have a return/onward ticket and a hotel reservation confirmation.; An International Certificate of Vaccination is required.	X
Antigua and Barbuda	Visa not required	3 months		✓
Argentina	Visa not required	90 days		✓
Armenia	Visa not required	180 days		X
Australia	Electronic Travel Authority (ETA)	90 days	90 days on each visit in 12-month period.; May enter using SmartGate.	✓
Austria	Freedom of movement		Passport card valid.	✓
Azerbaijan	eVisa	30 days		X
Bahamas	Visa not required	3 months	Extension of stay is possible.	✓
Bahrain	eVisa / Visa on arrival	14 days	Visa on arrival is single entry, subject to a fee.; Multiple entry visa available on arrival for 1 month stay.; Irish citizens can also apply for e-Visas as an alternative.	X
Bangladesh	Visa on arrival	30 days	Visitors can apply to extend their stay when in the country.	X
Barbados	Visa not required	6 months	Visitors must have proof of onward travel, whereby their final destination is their country of residence or origin.	✓
Belarus	Visa not required	30 days	Temporary visa-free regime, expires 31 December 2025.; Visa-free entry should not exceed 90 days per calendar year.; The Irish government advises its citizens not to travel to Belarus due to Belarus' support of the ongoing war in Ukraine, and limited options for Irish citizens in the country to leave.	X
Belgium	Freedom of movement		Passport card valid.	✓
Belize	Visa not required			✓
Benin	eVisa	30 days	Must have an international vaccination certificate.	X
Bhutan	eVisa		Pre-approved visa can be picked up on arrival.; Visitors are required to book with a registered tour operator in Bhutan.	✓
Bolivia	Visa not required	90 days	90 days within any year period.	X
Bosnia and Herzegovina	Visa not required	90 days	90 days within any 6-month period.; Passport card valid.	X
Botswana	Visa not required	90 days	Extension to the visa-free period must be applied for in advance.	X
Brazil	Visa not required	90 days	Extension of stay is possible.	X
Brunei	Visa not required	90 days		✓
Bulgaria	Freedom of movement		Passport card valid.	✓
Burkina Faso	eVisa / Visa on arrival	1 month	The Irish government advises its citizens not to travel to Burkina Faso due to the political and security situation in the country.	X
Burundi	Visa on arrival	1 month	The Irish government advises its citizens not to travel to Burundi due to safety concerns.	X
Cambodia	eVisa / Visa on arrival	30 days	Visa is also obtainable online.; Visitors are not permitted to make day-trips to Cambodia (except in certain circumstances).	X
Cameroon	eVisa		Pre-approved visa can be picked up on arrival.	✓
Canada	eTA / Visa not required	6 months	eTA required if arriving by air.	✓
Cape Verde	Visa not required	30 days	Must register online at least five days prior to arrival.	X
Central African Republic	Visa required		The Irish government advises its citizens not to travel to Central African Republic due to the security situation in the country.	✓
Chad	Visa required		Visitors holding an 'entry authorisation' letter can pick up a visa on arrival.	✓
Chile	Visa not required	90 days		X
China	Visa not required	30 days	Temporary visa-free regime, effective from 14 March 2024 until 31 December 2026.; 240-hour (10-day) visa-free transit to a third country or region (including Hong Kong, Macau or Taiwan) using any mode of transport. Must have a confirmed onward ticket/itinerary, and enter through 1 of 64 approved ports.; During which, may freely travel within the 24 provinces permitted for visa-free transit and engage in tourism, business, and visits.; 24-hour visa-free transit to a third country or region (including Hong Kong, Macau, and Taiwan), is available at most international airports, without leaving the airport.; Travellers who need to leave the airport may obtain a temporary entry permit from immigration.; 5-day port visa (Visa on Arrival) for Shenzhen if arriving at designated ports of entry from Hong Kong by land or sea, for stays within Shenzhen.; 3-day port visa (Visa on Arrival) if arriving in Zhuhai or Xiamen at designated ports of entry, for stays within the respective city.; 15-day visa-free entry for cruise ship passengers in tour groups, if arriving at any cruise port along China's coastline, including but not limited to Tianjin; Dalian; Shanghai; Lianyungang; Wenzhou; Zhoushan; Xiamen; Qingdao; Guangzhou; Shenzhen; Beihai; Haikou; Sanya. May further travel inland to all regions of coastal provinces (and equivalents) and Beijing.; May apply for a port visa (Visa on Arrival) if travelling for an urgent, qualified reason. Prior clearance for port visa is highly recommended or may be denied boarding by airlines.	X
Colombia	Visa not required	90 days	Visitors may only enter Colombia for up to 180 days in any calendar year.	X
Comoros	Visa on arrival	45 days		X
Republic of the Congo	Visa required			✓
Democratic Republic of the Congo	eVisa	7 days	The Irish government advises its citizens not to travel to Democratic Republic of Congo (DRC) due to security concerns.	✓
Costa Rica	Visa not required	90 days		✓
Côte d'Ivoire	eVisa	3 months	e-Visa holders must arrive via Port Bouet Airport.	X
Croatia	Freedom of movement		Passport card valid.	✓
Cuba	eVisa/Tourist card required	90 days	Can be extended up to 90 days with a fee.	✓
Cyprus	Freedom of movement		Passport card valid.	✓
Czech Republic	Freedom of movement		Passport card valid.	✓
Denmark	Freedom of movement		Passport card valid.	✓
Djibouti	eVisa	90 days		X
Dominica	Visa not required	6 months		✓
Dominican Republic	Visa not required			X
Ecuador	Visa not required	90 days	Extension of stay is possible.	X
Egypt	eVisa / Visa on arrival	30 days		X
El Salvador	Visa not required	3 months		✓
Equatorial Guinea	eVisa			✓
Eritrea	Visa required		Pre-approved visa can be picked up on arrival.	✓
Estonia	Freedom of movement		Passport card valid.	✓
Eswatini	Visa not required	30 days	Extension of stay possible for a maximum of 90 days in total.	✓
Ethiopia	eVisa / Visa on arrival	up to 90 days	Visa on arrival is obtainable only at Addis Ababa Bole International Airport.; e-Visa holders must arrive via Addis Ababa Bole International Airport.; e-Visa is available for 30 or 90 days.	X
Fiji	Visa not required	4 months		✓
Finland	Freedom of movement		Passport card valid.	✓
France	Freedom of movement		Passport card valid.	✓
Gabon	eVisa	90 days	e-Visa holders must arrive via Libreville International Airport.	X
Gambia	Visa not required	90 days		X
Georgia	Visa not required	1 year	Passport card valid.	✓
Germany	Freedom of movement		Passport card valid.	✓
Ghana	Visa required		Pre-approved visa can be picked up on arrival.	✓
Greece	Freedom of movement		Passport card valid.	✓
Grenada	Visa not required	3 months		✓
Guatemala	Visa not required	90 days		✓
Guinea	eVisa	90 days		X
Guinea-Bissau	Visa on arrival	90 days		X
Guyana	Visa not required			✓
Haiti	Visa not required	90 days	The Irish government advises its citizens not to travel to Haiti due to the volatile situation in the country.	X
Honduras	Visa not required	3 months		✓
Hungary	Freedom of movement		Passport card valid.	✓
Iceland	Freedom of movement		Passport card valid.	✓
India	eVisa	30 days	e-Visa holders must arrive via 32 designated airports (Note: Ahmedabad; Amritsar; Bagdogra; Bengaluru; Bhubaneswar; Chandigarh; Chennai; Coimbatore; Delhi; Gaya; Goa-Dabolim; Goa-Manohar; Guwahati; Hyderabad; Indore; Jaipur; Kannur; Kochi; Kolkata; Kozhikode; Lucknow; Madurai; Mangaluru; Mumbai; Nagpur; Port Blair; Pune; Surat; Thiruvananthapuram; Tiruchirappalli; Varanasi; Visakhapatnam) or 5 designated seaports. (Note: Chennai; Cochin; Mormugao; Mumbai; Mangalore); An Indian e-Tourist Visa may only be obtained twice within 1 calendar year.; Foreigners of Pakistani origin or who hold a Pakistani Passport are not eligible for an e-Visa. Foreigners who are not Pakistani nationals, but whose parents or grandparents (either paternal or maternal) were born in, or were permanent residents in Pakistan, are also not eligible for an e-Visa.	X
Indonesia	e-VOA / Visa on arrival	30 days	Not available at all entry points.	X
Iran	eVisa	30 days	Passengers who have already made an application, at least two days before arrival, at the Iranian Ministry of Foreign Affair's E-Visa website and present the submission notification at the airport's visa desk may obtain a visa on arrival.; Women will be refused entry if not wearing Islamic head cover, scarf, long sleeves or stockings.; The Irish government advises its citizens not to travel to Iran due to the security situation in the country, and arbitrary arrest and detentions of European citizens by the Iranian authorities.	X
Iraq	eVisa / Visa on arrival	60 days	Irish citizens can obtain a visa on arrival at Iraq's airports, land and sea crossings for 60 days, for a fee of 75 USD.; The Irish government advises its citizens not to travel to Iraq due to the extremely dangerous security situation and the high threat of terrorist attacks in the country.	X
Israel	Electronic Travel Authorization	3 months	Extension of stay is possible.	✓
Italy	Freedom of movement		Passport card valid	✓
Jamaica	Visa not required	90 days		X
Japan	Visa not required	90 days	Irish citizens may apply for an extension of stay with the Ministry of Justice for up to 6 months.	✓
Jordan	eVisa / Visa on arrival		Visa can be obtained upon arrival, it will cost a total of 40 JOD, obtainable at most international ports of entry and land border crossings (except King Hussein/Allenby Bridge); Visa fees may be waived for those in possession of a Jordan Pass depending on the length of their visit to the kingdom.	X
Kazakhstan	Visa not required	30 days		X
Kenya	Electronic Travel Authorisation	90 days	Applications can be submitted up to 90 days prior to travel and must be submitted at least 3 days in advance.; eTA fee is 32.50 USD.; Proof of reservation at the hotel where visitors plan to stay is required (if staying with friends, an invitation letter is also acceptable).; Yellow fever vaccination certificate is required if coming from endemic countries.	X
Kiribati	Visa not required	30 days		✓
North Korea	Visa required			✓
South Korea	Electronic Travel Authorization	90 days	The validity period of a K-ETA is 3 years from the date of approval.	✓
Kuwait	eVisa / Visa on arrival	3 months		X
Kyrgyzstan	Visa not required	60 days		X
Laos	eVisa / Visa on arrival	30 days	18 (Note: Savannakhet Airport; Lanetoui - Mengkang (China); Meuangmom - Wan Pong (Myanmar); Banvang - Ban Khok Phai (Thailand); Namngeun - Huay Kon (Thailand); Paksan - Bueng Kan (Thailand); Paktaphan - Pak Saeng (Thailand); Pangmon - Ban Huak (Thailand); Phoudou (Thailand); Dak ta ock - Nam Giang (Vietnam); La Lai (Vietnam); Namkan (Vietnam); Namphao - Cau Treo (Vietnam); Namsoy - Na Meo (Vietnam); Naphao - Cha Lo (Vietnam); Pahang - Long Sap (Vietnam); Panghok - Tây Trang (Vietnam); Phoukeua - Bo Y (Vietnam)) of the 33 border crossings are only open to regular visa holders.; e-Visa may be used to enter Laos through the Luang Prabang, Pakse and Vientiane international airports, 3 Thai-Lao Friendship Bridges (Note: Vientiane (Friendship Bridge 1); Savannakhet (Friendship Bridge 2); Bokeo (Friendship Bridge 4)), in Boten (road and railroad), and in Vientiane (at Khamsavath railway station).; Visa on arrival is available at the Luang Prabang, Pakse and Vientiane international airports, 4 Thai-Lao Friendship Bridges (Note: Vientiane (Friendship Bridge 1); Savannakhet (Friendship Bridge 2); Khammouane (Friendship Bridge 3); Bokeo (Friendship Bridge 4)) and 7 border crossings. (Note: Nongnokkheane - Trapeang Kriel (Cambodia); Boten - Bo han (China); Golden Triangle/Samliemkham (Thailand); Khamsavath railway station (Thailand); Namheuang - Ban Na Kraseng (Thailand); Vang tao - Chongmek (Thailand); Dansavan - Lao Bảo (Vietnam))	X
Latvia	Freedom of movement		Passport card valid	✓
Lebanon	Free visa on arrival	1 month	Free visa on arrival can be granted whenever a telephone number and address in Lebanon is provided.; Visa can be extended for an additional two months.	X
Lesotho	Visa not required	90 days		✓
Liberia	Visa required		Pre-approved visa can be picked up on arrival, subject to conditions.	✓
Libya	eVisa		The Irish government advises its citizens not to travel to Libya due to the volatile situation in the country.	✓
Liechtenstein	Freedom of movement		Passport card valid.	✓
Lithuania	Freedom of movement		Passport card valid.	✓
Luxembourg	Freedom of movement		Passport card valid.	✓
Madagascar	eVisa/Visa on arrival	60 days		X
Malawi	Visa not required	30 days		X
Malaysia	Visa not required	3 months	If no return ticket is held, one must be purchased at the border or entry will be refused.	✓
Maldives	Free visa on arrival	30 days		X
Mali	Visa required		The Irish government advises its citizens not to travel to Mali due to security concerns.	✓
Malta	Freedom of movement		Passport card valid.	✓
Marshall Islands	Visa not required	90 days	90 days within any 180-day period.	X
Mauritania	eVisa		Available at Nouakchott–Oumtounsy International Airport.	X
Mauritius	Visa not required	90 days	180 days maximum stay in any 1 calendar year.	X
Mexico	Visa not required	180 days		✓
Micronesia	Visa not required	30 days	Extension of stay is possible.	X
Moldova	Visa not required	90 days	90 days within any 180 day period.; Passport card valid.	X
Monaco	Visa not required		Passport card valid.	✓
Mongolia	Visa not required	30 days	The Ministry of Foreign Affairs of Mongolia has exempted visas for 34 countries from January 2023 to December 2026.	X
Montenegro	Visa not required	90 days	Passport card valid for 30 days.	X
Morocco	Visa not required	90 days		X
Mozambique	eVisa	30 days	Travelers must register on the e-Visa platform at least 48 hours prior to travel and pay a processing fee of 650 MT.	X
Myanmar	eVisa	28 days	e-Visa holders must arrive via Yangon, Nay Pyi Taw or Mandalay airports or via land border crossings with Thailand — Tachileik, Myawaddy and Kawthaung or India — Rih Khaw Dar and Tamu.; e-Visa available for both tourism (allowed stay is 28 days) or business (allowed stay is 70 days) purposes.; The Irish government advises its citizens not to travel to Myanmar due to the ongoing situation in the country.	X
Namibia	Visa not required	3 months		X
Nauru	Visa required		Visa requirement waived for holders of an Entry Permit letter.	X
Nepal	Online Visa / Visa on arrival	90 days	Extension of stay is possible of up to 150 days.; Business travellers can obtain a visa on arrival for a maximum stay of 5 years, subject to a fee and a license issued by the Ministry of Industry.	X
Netherlands	Freedom of movement		(European Netherlands); Passport card valid.	✓
New Zealand	New Zealand Electronic Travel Authority (NZeTA)	3 months	May enter using eGate.; International Visitor Conservation and Tourism Levy must be paid upon requesting an Electronic Travel Authority.; Holders of an Australian Permanent Resident Visa or Resident Return Visa may be granted a New Zealand Resident Visa on arrival permitting indefinite stay (pursuant to the Trans-Tasman Travel Arrangement), subject to meeting character requirements and obtaining an Electronic Travel Authority prior to departure. Such travellers are not required to pay the International Visitor Conservation and Tourism Levy.	✓
Nicaragua	Visa not required	90 days	Tourist card must be obtained on arrival, subject to a fee.; Extension of stay is possible.	✓
Niger	Visa required		The Irish government advises its citizens not to travel to Niger due to the political and security situation in the country.	✓
Nigeria	eVisa	90 days	Pre-approved visa can be picked up on arrival.	✓
North Macedonia	Visa not required	90 days	Passport card valid.	X
Norway	Freedom of movement		Passport card valid.	✓
Oman	Visa not required / eVisa	14 days / 30 days	A visa waiver is in place for travellers who are arriving directly from the Emirate of Dubai who have a visa or an entrance stamp from Dubai, whereby the visa must be valid for 21 days at least upon arrival in Oman.; A visa waiver is in place for travellers who are arriving directly from Qatar, whereby the visa must state as being valid for Oman and must be valid for at least one month on arrival.	X
Pakistan	eVisa	90 days		X
Palau	Free visa on arrival	30 days	Extension is possible for a fee.	X
Panama	Visa not required	90 days		✓
Papua New Guinea	eVisa	60 days	Available at Gurney Airport (Alotau), Mount Hagen Airport, Port Moresby Airport and Tokua Airport (Rabaul).	X
Paraguay	Visa not required	90 days		X
Peru	Visa not required	183 days		X
Philippines	Visa not required	30 days		X
Poland	Freedom of movement		Passport card valid.	✓
Portugal	Freedom of movement		Passport card valid.	✓
Qatar	Visa not required	30 days	Visa waiver available for Irish citizens with a 30 day extension available.	X
Romania	Freedom of movement		Passport card valid.	✓
Russia	eVisa	16 days	Visa waiver available for passengers arriving by cruise only who are staying in Russia for a maximum of 72 hours.; The Irish government advises its citizens not to travel to Russia due to the ongoing war in Ukraine, and the security situation in the country.	X
Rwanda	eVisa / Visa on arrival	30 days		X
Saint Kitts and Nevis	Electronic Travel Authorisation	3 months	Extension of stay is possible.	✓
Saint Lucia	Visa not required	6 weeks	Extension of stay is possible.	✓
Saint Vincent and the Grenadines	Visa not required	3 months	Extension of stay is possible.	✓
Samoa	Visa not required	60 days	Extension of stay is possible.	✓
San Marino	Visa not required		Passport card valid.	✓
São Tomé and Príncipe	Visa not required	15 days		X
Saudi Arabia	eVisa / Visa on arrival	90 days		X
Senegal	Visa not required	90 days		X
Serbia	Visa not required	90 days	Irish citizens may stay in Serbia for 90 days within any 6-month period.; Extension is possible.; Passport card valid.	X
Seychelles	Visa not required	3 months	Irish citizens can extend their stay for three months, up to a maximum of 12 months.; Visitor's permit is issued free of charge, subject to documentation being provided at the entry point.	✓
Sierra Leone	eVisa / Visa on arrival	3 months / 30 days		X
Singapore	Visa not required	90 days	Extension of stay possible.	✓
Slovakia	Freedom of movement		Passport card valid.	✓
Slovenia	Freedom of movement		Passport card.	✓
Solomon Islands	Free Visitor's permit on arrival	3 months	3 months within a year period.	✓
Somalia	eVisa		Available at Berbera, Borama, Burao, Erigavo and Hargeisa airports.; 30 days, available at Bosaso Airport, Galcaio Airport and Mogadishu Airport.; The Irish government advises its citizens not to travel to Somalia due to the volatile security situation in the country.	X
South Africa	Visa not required			X
South Sudan	eVisa		Obtainable online.; Printed visa authorization must be presented at the time of travel.; The Irish government advises its citizens not to travel to South Sudan due to security concerns.	X
Spain	Freedom of movement		Passport card valid.	✓
Sri Lanka	eVisa / Visa on arrival	60 days / 30 days	Sri Lanka introduced an ETA valid for 30 days.	X
Sudan	Visa required		The Irish government advises its citizens not to travel to Sudan due to the ongoing military conflict in the country.; Khartoum International Airport is currently closed, leaving Irish citizens options to leave very limited.	✓
Suriname	Visa not required	90 days	An entrance fee of USD 50 or EUR 50 must be paid online prior to arrival.; Multiple entry e-Visa is also available.	X
Sweden	Freedom of movement		Passport card valid.	✓
Switzerland	Freedom of movement		Passport card valid.	✓
Syria	Visa not required		The Irish government advises its citizens not to travel to Syria due to the ongoing conflict and insecurity in the country. Irish citizens currently in Syria are advised to leave as soon as possible.	X
Tajikistan	Visa not required	30 days	Visa also available online.	X
Tanzania	eVisa / Visa on arrival	90 days		X
Thailand	Visa not required	60 days	ACMECS Single Visa issued by Cambodia and Thailand are valid for 90 days from the date of issue and are valid for a stay of 60 days in Thailand.; Extension of stay is possible.; Maximum two visits annually if not arriving by air.	X
Timor-Leste	Visa on arrival	30 days	Irish and British citizens, unlike other EU citizens, must pay a 30 USD visa fee on arrival.	X
Togo	eVisa	15 days	Extension of stay possible for an additional 90 days, subject to a fee.	X
Tonga	Free visa on arrival	31 days	Extension of stay for a further 5 months is possible.	X
Trinidad and Tobago	Visa not required			✓
Tunisia	Visa not required	3 months		X
Turkey	Visa not required	90 days		X
Turkmenistan	Visa required		Pre-approved visa can be picked up on arrival.	X
Tuvalu	Visa on arrival	30 days		X
Uganda	Visa not required		Irish Citizens are not required to apply for an eVisa and are granted a fee-free visa on arrival.; An East Africa Tourist Visa issued by Kenya or Rwanda can also be used for entry.	X
Ukraine	Visa not required	90 days	90 days within any 180 day period.; The Irish government advises its citizens not to travel to Ukraine due to Russia's aggression towards Ukraine. Irish citizens currently in Ukraine are advised to leave if able to do so.	✓
United Arab Emirates	Visa not required	30 days	Extension of stay is possible for a further 30 days with a fee.	✓
United Kingdom	Freedom of movement		Freedom of movement under Common Travel Area (in Constituent countries); Passport card valid	✓
United States	Visa Waiver Program	90 days	ESTA is valid for 2 years from the date of issuance.; ESTA is also required when entering the country by cruise ship or land.; A Form I-94 is required for entry into the United States by land. It carries a $30 fee and can be obtained either online or upon arrival.; Visa required for nationals of VWP countries who have travelled or been present in Iran, Iraq, Libya, North Korea, Somalia, Sudan, Syria or Yemen at any time on or after 1 March 2011 or Cuba at any time on or after 12 January 2021, or nationals of VWP countries who are also nationals of Iran, Iraq, North Korea, Sudan or Syria. Exceptions apply if the travel was in military or diplomatic service of the VWP country.	✓
Uruguay	Visa not required	90 days	Extension of stay is possible for a further 90 days.	X
Uzbekistan	Visa not required	30 days		X
Vanuatu	Visa not required	30 days		✓
Vatican City	Visa not required		Passport card valid.	✓
Venezuela	Visa not required	90 days	Extension of stay is possible for a further 90 days.	X
Vietnam	eVisa		e-Visa is valid for 90 days and multiple entry.	X
Yemen	Visa required		The Irish government advises its citizens not to travel to Yemen due to the volatile situation in the country. Terrorism, civil unrest, health risks, kidnapping, armed conflict, and landmines are present.	✓
Zambia	Visa not required	30 days	For those travelling to Zambia for business, the maximum stay is 30 days in any one-year period.; Tourists are allowed 90 days in any 1-year period.	X
Zimbabwe	eVisa / Visa on arrival	30 days	For those travelling to Zimbabwe for business, a visa on arrival can also be issued for a maximum stay of 30 days.	X

=== Territories and disputed areas ===
Visa requirements for Irish citizens for visits to various territories, disputed areas, partially recognized countries and restricted zones:

Visitor to	Visa requirement	Allowed stay	Notes (excluding departure fees)
Europe
Abkhazia	Visa required		
Mount Athos	Special permit required		Special permit required (4 days: 25 euro for Orthodox visitors, 35 euro for non-Orthodox visitors, 18 euro for students). There is a visitors' quota: maximum 100 Orthodox and 10 non-Orthodox per day and women are not allowed.
(Belarus) Brest and Grodno	Visa not required	15 days	
Northern Cyprus	Visa not required	3 months	Passport card valid.
(United Nations) UN Buffer Zone in Cyprus	Visa required		Access Permit is required for travelling inside the zone, except Civil Use Areas.
Faroe Islands	Visa not required		Passport card valid.
Gibraltar	Visa not required		Passport card valid.
Guernsey	Freedom of movement		Passport card valid.
Guernsey Alderney	Freedom of movement		Passport card valid.
Guernsey Sark	Freedom of movement		Passport card valid.
Isle of Man	Freedom of movement		Passport card valid.
(Norway) Jan Mayen	Permit required		Permit issued by the local police required for staying for less than 24 hours and permit issued by the Norwegian police for staying for more than 24 hours.
Jersey	Freedom of movement		Passport card valid.
Kosovo	Visa not required	90 days	Passport card valid.
Closed cities and regions in Russia	Special authorization required		
South Ossetia	Visa not required		Multiple entry visa to Russia and three-day prior notification are required to enter South Ossetia.
Transnistria	Visa not required		Registration required after 24 h.
Africa
Eritrea (outside Asmara)	Travel permit required		Visa covers Asmara only; to travel in the rest of the country, a Travel Permit for Foreigners is required (20 Eritrean nakfa).
Sahrawi Arab Democratic Republic (Western Sahara controlled territory)	Visa not required	3 months	
Somaliland	Visa on arrival	30 days	30 days for 30 USD, payable on arrival.
Sudan outside Khartoum	Travel permit required		All foreigners traveling more than 25 km (16 mi) outside of Khartoum must obtain a travel permit.
(Sudan) Darfur	Travel permit required		Separate travel permit is required.
Asia
Hong Kong	Visa not required	90 days	
Protected and restricted areas of India	PAP/RAP required		Protected Area Permit (PAP) required for whole states of Nagaland and Sikkim and parts of states Manipur, Arunachal Pradesh, Uttaranchal, Jammu and Kashmir, Rajasthan, Himachal Pradesh. Restricted Area Permit (RAP) required for all of Andaman and Nicobar Islands and parts of Sikkim. Some of these requirements are occasionally lifted for a year.
Iraqi Kurdistan	eVisa	30 days	
(Kazakhstan) Baikonur and Priozersk	Special permission required		Special permission required for the town of Baikonur and surrounding areas in Kyzylorda Oblast, and the town of Gvardeyskiy near Almaty.
(Iran) Kish Island	Visa not required		Visitors to Kish Island do not require a visa.
Macao	Visa not required	90 days	
(Malaysia) Sabah and Sarawak	Visa not required		These states have their own immigration authorities and passport is required to travel to them, however the same visa applies.
North Korea outside Pyongyang	Permission required		People are not allowed to leave the capital city, tourists can only leave the capital with a governmental tourist guide (no independent moving)
Palestine	Visa not required		Arrival by sea to Gaza Strip not allowed.
Taiwan	Visa not required	90 days	
(Tajikistan) Gorno-Badakhshan Autonomous Province	OIVR permit required		OIVR permit required (15+5 Tajikistani Somoni) and another special permit (free of charge) is required for Lake Sarez.
Closed cities of Turkmenistan	Special permit required		A special permit, issued prior to arrival by Ministry of Foreign Affairs, is required if visiting the following places: Atamurat, Cheleken, Dashoguz, Serakhs and Serhetabat.
(China) Tibet Autonomous Region	TTP required		Tibet Travel Permit required (10 USD).
(United Nations) Korean Demilitarized Zone	Permission required		Restricted zone.
(United Nations) UNDOF Zone and Ghajar	Permission required		Restricted zones.
(Vietnam) Phú Quốc	Visa not required	30 days	
Yemen outside Sanaa or Aden	Special permission required		Special permission needed for travel outside Sanaa or Aden.
Caribbean and North Atlantic
Anguilla	Visa not required	3 months	
Aruba	Visa not required	30 days	
(Netherlands) Bonaire, St. Eustatius and Saba	Visa not required	3 months	
Bermuda	Visa not required	21 days	Extendable for longer stays.
British Virgin Islands	Visa not required	1 month	Extendable for longer stays.
Cayman Islands	Visa not required	6 months	
(Colombia) San Andrés and Leticia	Tourist Card on arrival		Visitors arriving at San Andrés and Leticia must buy tourist cards on arrival.
Curacao	Visa not required	3 months	
Montserrat	Visa not required	6 months	
Greenland	Visa not required		
(Venezuela) Margarita Island	Visa not required		All visitors are fingerprinted.
Puerto Rico	Visa not required	90 days	Visa not required under the Visa Waiver Program, for 90 days on arrival from overseas for 2 years. ESTA required.
Saint Pierre and Miquelon	Visa not required		Passport card valid.
Sint Maarten	Visa not required	3 months	
Turks and Caicos Islands	Visa not required	90 days	
U.S. Virgin Islands	Visa not required	90 days	Visa not required under the Visa Waiver Program, for 90 days on arrival from overseas for 2 years. ESTA required.
Oceania
American Samoa	Visa not required		Visa not required under the Entry Permit Waiver Program, but authorisation is required.
(Australia) Ashmore and Cartier Islands	Special authorisation required		
(France) Clipperton Island	Special permit required		
Cook Islands	Visa not required	31 days	
(Fiji) Lau Province	Special permission required		
French Polynesia	Visa not required		Passport card valid.
Guam	Visa not required	90 days	Visa not required under the Visa Waiver Program for 90 days on arrival from overseas for 2 years. ESTA required.
New Caledonia	Visa not required	3 months	Passport card valid
Niue	Visa on arrival	30 days	Visa on arrival valid for 30 days is issued free of charge.
Northern Mariana Islands	Visa not required		
Pitcairn Islands	Visa not required	14 days	14 days visa free and landing fee 35 USD or tax of 5 USD if not going ashore.
Tokelau	Entry permit required		
United States Minor Outlying Islands	Special permit required		Special permits required for Baker Island, Howland Island, Jarvis Island, Johnston Atoll, Kingman Reef, Midway Atoll, Palmyra Atoll and Wake Island.
Wallis and Futuna	Visa not required		Passport card valid.
South America
Galápagos	Pre-registration required		Online pre-registration is required. Transit Control Card must also be obtained at the airport prior to departure.
South Atlantic and Antarctica
Falkland Islands	Visa not required	1 month	A visitor permit is normally issued as a stamp in the passport on arrival.
Ascension Island	eVisa	3 months	e-Visa for 3 months within any year period.
Saint Helena	Entry Permit on arrival	183 days	Entry Permit (£25) for 183 days is issued on arrival.
Tristan da Cunha	Permission required		Permission to land required for 15/30 pounds sterling (yacht/ship passenger) for Tristan da Cunha Island or 20 pounds sterling for Gough Island, Inaccessible Island or Nightingale Islands.
South Georgia and the South Sandwich Islands	Permit required		Pre-arrival permit from the Commissioner required (72 hours / 1 month for 110 / 160 pounds sterling).
Antarctica	Special permits required		Special permits required for French Southern and Antarctic Lands, (Argentine Antarctica) , (Australia) Australian Antarctic Territory, (Antártica Chilena Province) Chilean Antarctic Territory, (Australia) Heard Island and McDonald Islands, (Norway) Peter I Island, (Norway) Queen Maud Land, (New Zealand) Ross Dependency.

== Non-ordinary passports ==
Holders of diplomatic or official passports of Ireland have additional visa-free access to Kuwait. Holders of diplomatic or service passports of any country have visa-free access to Cape Verde, Ethiopia, Mali and Zimbabwe.

== Non-visa restrictions ==
=== Blank passport pages ===
Many countries require a minimum number of blank pages to be available in the passport being presented, typically one or two pages. Endorsement pages, which often appear after the visa pages, are not counted as being valid or available.

=== Vaccination ===
Cover of the new International Certificate of Vaccination issued by the Bureau of Quarantine in the Philippines since 2021

The African countries of Angola, Benin, Burkina Faso, Burundi, Cameroon, Central African Republic, Democratic Republic of the Congo, Republic of the Congo, Côte d'Ivoire, Gabon, Ghana, Guinea-Bissau, Mali, Niger, Sierra Leone and Togo, South Sudan and Uganda, along with French Guiana in South America, require all incoming passengers older than nine months to one year, to have a current International Certificate of Vaccination or Prophylaxis.

Some other countries require vaccination only if the passenger is coming from an infected area or has visited one recently or has transited for 12 hours in those countries: Algeria, Botswana, Cabo Verde, Chad, Djibouti, Egypt, Eswatini, Ethiopia, Gambia, Ghana, Guinea, Lesotho, Libya, Equatorial Guinea, Eritrea, Madagascar, Malawi, Mauritania, Mauritius, Mozambique, Namibia, Nigeria, Papua New Guinea, Seychelles, Somalia, South Africa, Sudan, Tunisia, Uganda, Tanzania, Zambia and Zimbabwe.

=== Passport validity length ===
Very few countries, such as Paraguay, just require a valid passport on arrival.

However many countries and groupings now require only an identity card – especially from their neighbours. Other countries may have special bilateral arrangements that depart from the generality of their passport validity length policies to shorten the period of passport validity required for each other's citizens or even accept passports that have already expired (but not been cancelled).

Some countries, such as Japan, Ireland and the United Kingdom, require a passport valid throughout the period of the intended stay.

In the absence of specific bilateral agreements, countries requiring passports to be valid for at least 6 more months on arrival include Afghanistan, Algeria, Anguilla, Bahrain, Bhutan, Botswana, British Virgin Islands, Brunei, Cambodia, Cameroon, Cape Verde, Cayman Islands, Central African Republic, Chad, Comoros, Costa Rica, Côte d'Ivoire, Curaçao, Ecuador, Egypt, El Salvador, Equatorial Guinea, Fiji, Gabon, Guinea Bissau, Guyana, Haiti, India, Indonesia, Iran, Iraq, Israel, Jordan, Kenya, Kiribati, Kuwait, Laos, Madagascar, Malaysia, Marshall Islands, Mongolia, Myanmar, Namibia, Nepal, Nicaragua, Nigeria, Oman, Palau, Papua New Guinea, Peru, Philippines, Qatar, Rwanda, Samoa, Saudi Arabia, Singapore, Solomon Islands, Somalia, Sri Lanka, Sudan, Suriname, Tanzania, Thailand, Timor-Leste, Tokelau, Tonga, Turkey, Tuvalu, Uganda, United Arab Emirates, Vanuatu, Venezuela, and Vietnam.

Countries requiring passports valid for at least 4 months on arrival include Micronesia and Zambia.

Countries requiring passports with a validity of at least 3 months beyond the date of intended departure include Azerbaijan, Bosnia and Herzegovina, Honduras, Montenegro, Nauru, Moldova and New Zealand. Similarly, the EEA countries of Iceland, Liechtenstein, Norway, all European Union countries (except Ireland) together with Switzerland also require 3 months validity beyond the date of the bearer's intended departure unless the bearer is an EEA or Swiss national.

Countries requiring passports valid for at least 3 months on arrival include Albania, North Macedonia, Panama, and Senegal.

Bermuda requires passports to be valid for at least 45 days upon entry.

Countries that require a passport validity of at least one month beyond the date of intended departure include Eritrea, Hong Kong, Lebanon, Macau, the Maldives and South Africa.

==== Maximum passport age ====
Countries of the Schengen area require non-EU passports to be less than 10 years old upon entry.

=== Criminal record ===
Some countries, including Australia, Canada, Fiji, New Zealand and the United States, routinely deny entry to non-citizens who have a criminal record, while others impose restrictions depending on the type of conviction and the length of the sentence.

=== Persona non grata ===
The government of a country can declare a diplomat persona non grata, banning them from entering the country or expelling them if they have already entered. In non-diplomatic use, the authorities of a country may also declare a foreigner persona non grata permanently or temporarily, usually because of unlawful activity.

=== Israeli stamps ===
Kuwait, Lebanon, Libya, and Yemen do not allow entry to people with passport stamps from Israel or whose passports have either a used or an unused Israeli visa, or where there is evidence of previous travel to Israel such as entry or exit stamps from neighbouring border posts in transit countries such as Jordan and Egypt.

To circumvent this Arab League boycott of Israel, the Israeli immigration services have now mostly ceased to stamp foreign nationals' passports on either entry to or exit from Israel (unless the entry is for some work-related purposes). Since 15 January 2013, Israel no longer stamps foreign passports at Ben Gurion Airport. Passports are still (as of 22 June 2017) stamped at Erez when passing into and out of Gaza.

Iran refuses admission to holders of passports containing an Israeli visa or stamp that is less than 12 months old.

=== Biometrics ===
Several countries mandate that all travellers, or all foreign travellers, be fingerprinted on arrival and will refuse admission to or even arrest travellers who refuse to comply. In some countries, such as the United States, this may apply even to transit passengers who merely wish to change planes rather than go landside.

Fingerprinting countries/regions include Afghanistan, Argentina, Brunei, Cambodia, China, Ethiopia, Ghana, Guinea, India, Japan, Kenya (both fingerprints and a photo are taken), Malaysia upon entry and departure, Mongolia, Saudi Arabia, the Schengen Area, Singapore, South Korea, Taiwan, Thailand, Uganda, the United Arab Emirates and the United States.

Many countries also require a photo be taken of people entering the country. The United States, which does not fully implement exit control formalities at its land frontiers (although long mandated by its own legislation), intends to implement facial recognition for passengers departing from international airports to identify people who overstay their visa.

Together with fingerprint and face recognition, iris scanning is one of three biometric identification technologies internationally standardised since 2006 by the International Civil Aviation Organization (ICAO) for use in e-passports and the United Arab Emirates conducts iris scanning on visitors who need to apply for a visa. The United States Department of Homeland Security has announced plans to greatly increase the biometric data it collects at US borders. In 2018, Singapore began trials of iris scanning at three land and maritime immigration checkpoints.

== Common Travel Area ==
Ireland and the United Kingdom, together with its Crown Dependencies of Guernsey, Jersey and the Isle of Man make up a Common Travel Area where:

- No ID is required for travel by land for British or Irish citizens
- Only photographic ID is required for travel by air or sea for British or Irish citizens (but some airlines - such as Ryanair - may mandate passports for all)

However, there are occasionally checks on coaches and trains moving between Northern Ireland and the Republic of Ireland. Citizens of third countries must have passports and, if required, visas to travel between the United Kingdom and Republic of Ireland.

British visas don't enable travel to Ireland for people without agreement with Ireland, and vice versa. Air and sea passengers travelling between the Common Travel Area and the Schengen Area are subject to systematic passport / identity checks.

== Right to consular protection in non-EU countries ==
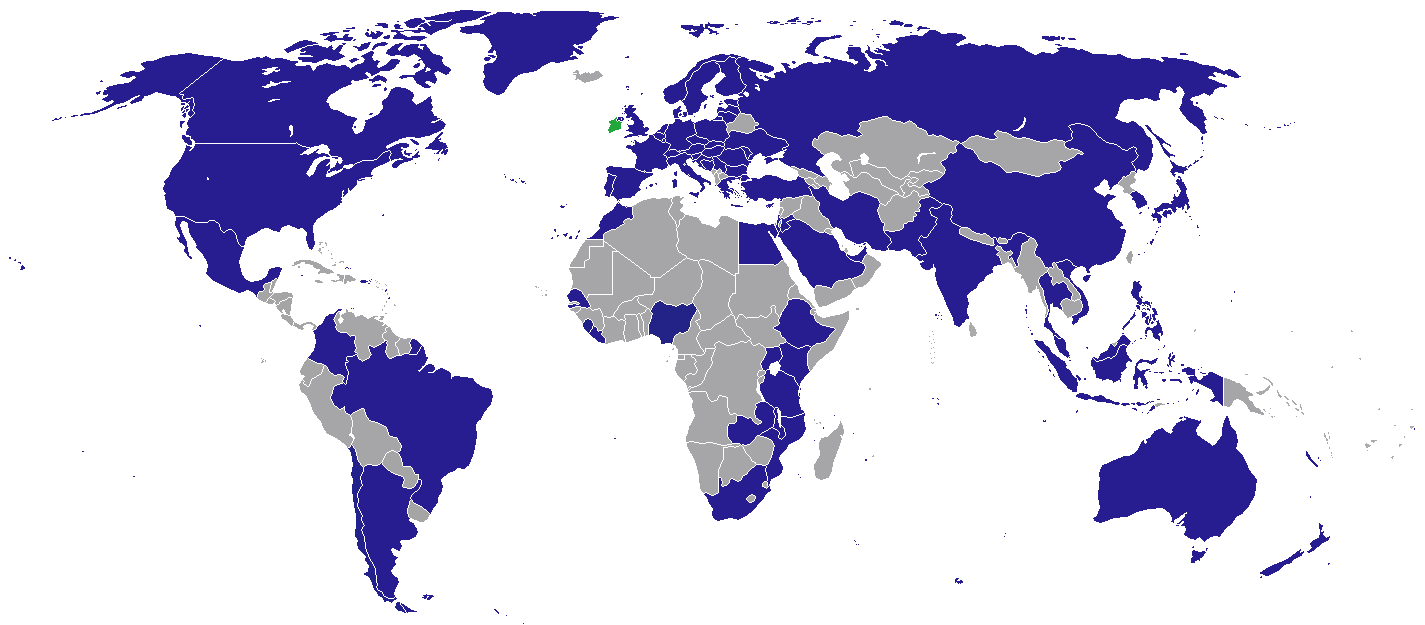
Countries with Irish diplomatic missions

As citizens of the European Union, all Irish citizens have the right to seek consular assistance and protection from embassies of fellow EU member states when they are in a non-EU country without an Irish embassy.

See also List of diplomatic missions of Ireland.

== See also ==
- Visa policy of Ireland
- Visa requirements for European Union citizens
- Irish passport
