= Visa policy of Ireland =

Policy on permits required to enter Ireland

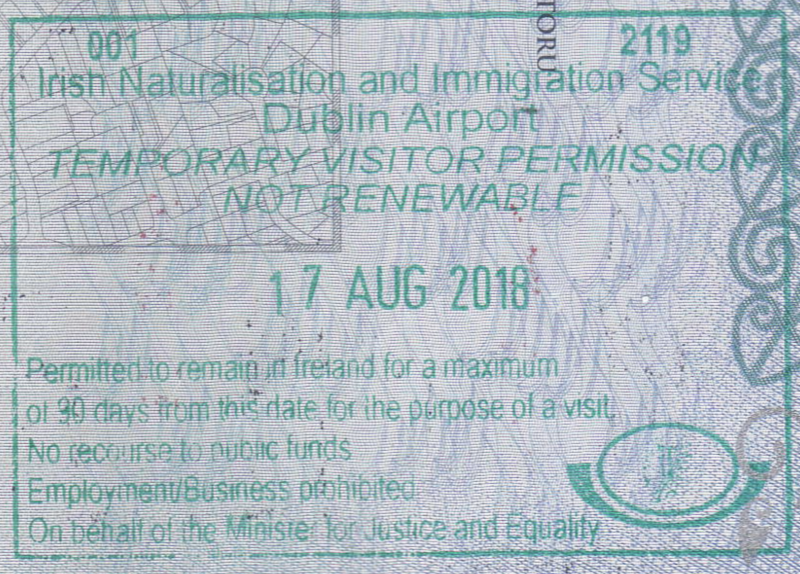
Entry stamp for Ireland

The visa policy of Ireland is set by the Government of Ireland and determines visa requirements for foreign citizens. If someone other than a European Union, EFTA or Common Travel Area citizen seeks entry to Ireland, they must be a national of a visa-exempt country or have a valid Irish visa issued by one of the Irish diplomatic missions around the world.

Although Ireland is a member of the European Union, it is not part of the Schengen Area and therefore sets its own visa policy. Ireland also operates the Common Travel Area with the United Kingdom, the Channel Islands and the Isle of Man which specifies open borders between the countries and territories. Established in 1923, it permits British and Irish citizens freedom of movement around the Common Travel Area and to cross its borders with minimal or no identity documents.

The visa policy of Ireland is similar to the visa policy of the Schengen Area. It grants visa-free entry to all Schengen Annex II nationalities, except for Albania, Bosnia and Herzegovina, Colombia, Dominica, Georgia, Honduras, Kosovo, Marshall Islands, Mauritius, Micronesia, Moldova, Montenegro, Nicaragua, North Macedonia, Palau, Peru, Saint Kitts and Nevis, Saint Lucia, Serbia, Timor-Leste, Trinidad and Tobago, and Venezuela. Ireland also grants visa-free entry to some additional countries – Belize, Fiji, Guyana, and Maldives.

== History ==
Ireland's visa policy has been amended since its inception through primary legislation and statutory instruments. The Aliens Act of 1935 confers the power of deportation and the power of immigration control to the Minister for Justice of the Irish Free State. On 12 April 1935, the Irish Free State exempted citizens of the United Kingdom, Canada, Commonwealth of Australia, Dominion of New Zealand, Union of South Africa, Dominion of Newfoundland and British India from the Aliens Act and therefore did not recognise those citizens as aliens. The 1946 Aliens Order required all aliens to present a passport to an immigration control officer for inspection within 24 hours if not arriving from Great Britain or Northern Ireland. The maximum stay for aliens was one month.

During the 1940s and 1950s, Ireland had concluded bilateral visa exemption agreements with countries of Western Europe.

In 1962, Ireland changed the definition of alien and now included those countries named above, with the exception of those born in Great Britain or Northern Ireland. The 1962 Aliens Amendment Order exempted citizens of Austria, Belgium, Denmark, Finland, France, West Germany, Greece, Iceland, Italy, Liechtenstein, Luxembourg, Monaco, the Netherlands, Norway, Spain, Sweden, Switzerland, Portugal, Tunisia, Turkey and the United States from visas for three months. It also gave special provisions to citizens of the British Commonwealth, (Note: The countries of the Commonwealth whose citizens benefited from the special provisions in 1962 were: United Kingdom and Colonies, Australia, Canada, Ceylon, Republic of Cyprus, Ghana, India, Federation of Malaya, New Zealand, Nigeria, Pakistan, Federation of Rhodesia and Nyasaland, Sierra Leone, State of Singapore, Tanganyika, and the Republic of South Africa.) whereby they were exempted by the Aliens Order of 1946, although they might be refused leave to land unless they complied with certain conditions. A 1966 amendment gave rights of admission to those states of the British Commonwealth, which was later revoked in 1972. In 1972, aliens were required to seek work permits from the Minister for Labour to work in the state. In 1975, Ireland published its first list of visa-exempt nationalities and also removed the special provisions from Commonwealth citizens under Irish law. In 1999 there was the first development of a comprehensive list of countries which required visas.

On 29 March 1988, the first Irish transit visa requirement was announced for Iran. Requirements for transit visas were announced for Poland, Bulgaria and Sri Lanka on 26 February 1988, for Moldova (3 February 1993), Cuba (1 November 1994), Iraq (19 July 1996). On 8 October 1996, Irish transit visa requirements were extended and included the countries currently listed as of January 2018, with the addition of Nigeria, the Federal Republic of Yugoslavia and Zaire. Zimbabwe was added on 8 November 2002, as were Georgia and Ukraine (9 June 2017).

In terms of visa exemptions, Lithuania, Latvia and Estonia were exempted on 30 April 1996, followed by Hong Kong (25 June 1997), Brunei (17 February 1997), Croatia (26 January 1999). On 13 February 2001, Ireland exempted the following countries: Antigua and Barbuda, Belize, Bolivia, Dominica, Fiji, Gambia, Guyana, Kiribati, Maldives, Mauritius, Saint Kitts and Nevis, Saint Lucia, Saint Vincent and the Grenadines, Seychelles, Solomon Islands, Tuvalu, Vanuatu. Macau was exempted on 27 April 2002, Slovakia (18 December 2003), Bulgaria and Romania (18 December 2006), Taiwan (1 July 2009), United Arab Emirates (31 January 2018) and Ukraine (25 February 2022).

In terms of countries removed from the list of visa-free nationalities, Sierra Leone was removed on 4 October 1994, and Kenya was removed on 15 March 1996. On 3 April 1996, Fiji, Guyana, Mauritius (all three later restored), Tanzania and Zambia were removed, followed by Ecuador (29 August 1997) and Slovakia (14 October 1998, later restored). Bangladesh, Ghana, India, Nigeria and Pakistan (1 January 1988); Turkey (19 November 1989); Uganda (12 August 1993); Bolivia (later restored), Colombia, Peru and Tunisia (1 April 1990) were all removed, as were Gambia (June 2001), Jamaica (18 December 2003), Mauritius (1 January 2010), Venezuela (29 April 2014) and Malawi (12 November 2015).

In response to the COVID-19 pandemic, visa-free travel from Argentina, Bolivia, Brazil, Chile, Guyana, Paraguay, South Africa and Uruguay was suspended from 28 January to 16 June 2021, and visa-free travel from Botswana, Eswatini, Lesotho and South Africa was suspended from 27 November to 22 December 2021.

Bolivia was removed from the list of visa-free nationalities on 12 September 2023; Dominica, Honduras and Vanuatu were removed on 7 March 2024, followed by Botswana and South Africa on 10 July 2024. Eswatini, Lesotho and Nauru were removed on 10 March 2025. Trinidad and Tobago was removed on 12 May 2025. Nicaragua, Saint Kitts and Nevis and Saint Lucia were removed on 15 June 2026.

== Visa policy map ==
Visa policy of the Republic of Ireland The Republic of Ireland Common Travel Area Freedom of movement (EU / EFTA) Visa not required (90 days) Visa not required if holding a valid UK visitor visa and having valid leave to enter/remain in the UK (90 days or the remaining period of validity of that leave to enter/remain in the UK, whichever is shorter; transit without visa) Visa required to enter Ireland, transit without visa Visa required to enter Ireland and for transit through Ireland

== Visa exemption ==
Citizens of the following countries and territories can enter Ireland without a visa:

=== As of right ===
- (United Kingdom) British citizens under the Common Travel Area arrangement (Note: May enter using a Gibraltar ID card, or, if arriving directly from the UK, any photographic identification (for example a bus pass or student ID card))
- All European Union citizens (Note: May enter on a national identity card)
- Citizens of EFTA member states

=== Visa-exempt ===
- Holders of a Residence Card of a family member of a Union citizen

The following persons do not require an entry visa and are granted permission to enter for three months when they arrive in Ireland:

- (United Kingdom) British Overseas Territories citizens
- (United Kingdom) British National (Overseas)
- (United Kingdom) British Overseas citizens
- Holders of a United Nations laissez-passer
- Holders of an Interpol Travel Document
- Citizens of the following countries and territories holding valid passports can visit Ireland up to 90 days (unless otherwise noted):

- Andorra
- Antigua and Barbuda
- Argentina
- Australia
- Bahamas
- Barbados
- Belize
- Brazil
- Brunei
- Canada
- Chile
- Costa Rica
- El Salvador
- Fiji
- Grenada
- Guatemala
- Guyana
- Hong Kong (Note: Persons holding a Hong Kong Special Administrative Region passport. See also British National (Overseas) for persons residing in Hong Kong holding a form of British nationality.)
- Israel
- Japan
- Kiribati
- Macau (Note: Persons holding a Macao Special Administrative Region passport.)
- Malaysia
- Maldives
- Mexico
- Monaco
- New Zealand
- Panama
- Paraguay
- Saint Vincent and the Grenadines
- Samoa
- San Marino
- Seychelles
- Singapore
- Solomon Islands
- South Korea
- Taiwan
- Tonga
- Tuvalu
- Ukraine (Note: For holders of biometric passports only.)
- United Arab Emirates
- United States
- Uruguay
- Vatican City

Date of visa changes
- Unknown: Bahamas, Belize, Maldives, Samoa, Seychelles, Solomon Islands and Tonga
- Australian, Barbadian, British, Canadian, Grenadian, Malaysian, New Zealander and Singaporean citizens have never needed a visa to gain access to Ireland
- 1 April 1947/1 May 1948: Belgium
- 1 April 1947: Sweden
- 1 May 1947: France
- 15 May 1947: Denmark and Netherlands
- 20 June 1947: Switzerland
- 1 January 1948: Norway
- 1 January 1949: Luxembourg
- 1 June 1949: Iceland
- 25 December 1949: Italy
- 15 July 1954: Monaco
- 1 February 1955: Finland
- 15 August 1955: Portugal
- 20 October 1955: Turkey (cancelled in 1989)
- 15 June 1956: Greece
- 17 April 1959: Spain
- 1 August 1975: Andorra, Argentina, Brazil, Chile, Costa Rica, Guatemala, Honduras, Japan, Mexico, Nicaragua, Panama, Uruguay and Vatican City (Argentina, Brazil, Chile and Uruguay were suspended on 28 January 2021 and resumed on 16 June 2021)
- 31 January 1986: Israel and Zimbabwe (Zimbabwe was cancelled in 2002)
- 12 July 1989: South Korea
- 12 June 1990: East Germany (as Germany from 3 October 1990)
- 17 September 1990: Czechoslovakia (as Czech Republic and Slovakia from 1 January 1993) and Hungary
- 20 November 1992: Poland
- 14 April 1993: Slovenia
- 1 May 1996: Estonia, Latvia and Lithuania
- 17 February 1997: Brunei
- 1 July 1997: Hong Kong
- 31 January 1999: Croatia
- 1 March 2001: Antigua and Barbuda, Belize, Bolivia (resumed), Dominica, Fiji (resumed), Gambia (resumed), Guyana (resumed), Kiribati, Maldives, Mauritius (resumed), Saint Kitts and Nevis, Saint Lucia, Saint Vincent and the Grenadines, Seychelles, Solomon Islands, Tuvalu and Vanuatu (Gambia was cancelled on 8 June 2001; Guyana was suspended on 28 January 2021 and resumed on 16 June 2021)
- 27 April 2002: Macao
- 18 December 2003: Slovakia (resumed)
- 1 August 2005: El Salvador, Paraguay and Tuvalu (all were resumed; Paraguay was suspended on 28 January 2021 and resumed again on 16 June 2021)
- 1 January 2007: Bulgaria and Romania
- 1 July 2009: Taiwan
- 31 January 2018: United Arab Emirates
- 25 February 2022: Ukraine

Cancelled:

- Sri Lanka: 31 May 1985
- Bangladesh, Ghana, India, Nigeria and Pakistan: 1 January 1988
- Turkey: 19 November 1989
- Bolivia, Colombia, Peru and Tunisia: 1 April 1990 (Bolivia was resumed in 2001)
- Yugoslavia: 6 November 1992
- Uganda: 12 August 1993
- Sierra Leone: 5 October 1994
- Gambia: 28 November 1995 (was resumed on 1 March 2001 and cancelled on 8 June 2001)
- Kenya: 15 March 1996
- Fiji, Guyana, Mauritius, Tanzania and Zambia: 4 April 1996 (Fiji, Guyana and Mauritius were resumed in 2001; Guyana was suspended on 28 January 2021 and resumed again on 16 June 2021)
- Ecuador: 30 August 1997
- Slovakia: 19 October 1998 (was resumed in 2003)
- El Salvador, Paraguay, Tuvalu and Zimbabwe: 8 November 2002 (El Salvador, Paraguay and Tuvalu were resumed in 2005; Paraguay was suspended on 28 January 2021 and resumed again on 16 June 2021)
- Jamaica: 18 December 2003
- Mauritius: 1 January 2010
- Venezuela: 24 June 2014
- Malawi: 30 November 2015
- Argentina, Bolivia, Brazil, Chile, Guyana, Paraguay, South Africa and Uruguay: suspended from 28 January to 16 June 2021
- Botswana, Eswatini, Lesotho and South Africa: suspended from 27 November to 22 December 2021
- Bolivia: 12 September 2023
- Dominica, Honduras and Vanuatu: 7 March 2024
- Botswana and South Africa: 10 July 2024
- Eswatini, Lesotho and Nauru: 10 March 2025
- Trinidad and Tobago: 12 May 2025
- Nicaragua, Saint Kitts and Nevis and Saint Lucia: 15 June 2026

=== Short stay visa waiver programme ===
The Irish short stay visa waiver programme was introduced in July 2011 and allows citizens of the countries below to enter Ireland if they are holders of a valid UK 'C' visa (short stay visa), have cleared immigration in the United Kingdom and have been granted leave for up to 180 days in the UK. They can enter Ireland visa-free for up to 90 days or until the end of their current permission to remain in the UK, whichever is shorter. They may enter Ireland from a country other than the UK as long as both their visa and their permission to remain in the UK have not expired. The scheme is not applicable to those who travel to the UK without a visa, are "visitors in transit", "visitors seeking to enter for the purpose of marriage or to enter a civil partnership", or long term visitors.

The scheme was initially set to run until 31 October 2012 but was later extended to 31 October 2016, then to 31 October 2021, then again to 31 October 2026.

- Bahrain
- Bosnia and Herzegovina
- China
- Colombia
- India
- Indonesia
- Kazakhstan
- Kosovo
- Kuwait
- Montenegro
- North Macedonia
- Oman
- Peru
- Philippines
- Qatar
- Saudi Arabia
- Serbia
- Thailand
- Turkey
- Uzbekistan
- Vietnam

Citizens of the above countries who hold a UK or Schengen long-term visa or residence permit still need to apply for an Irish visa, but will have the application fee waived.

=== British-Irish Visa Scheme ===
Ireland and the United Kingdom have agreed on a joint British-Irish Visa Scheme (BIVS) in 2014. Under the agreement between Ireland and United Kingdom, citizens of the following countries who hold a valid UK visa endorsed with BIVS and who have cleared immigration in the United Kingdom can visit Ireland visa-free for up to 90 days (or until their current permission to enter/remain in the UK, whichever is shorter).

Similar to those eligible under the Visa Waiver Programme, they may enter Ireland from a country other than the UK as long as both their visa and their permission to remain in the UK have not expired.

- China
- India

=== Non-ordinary passport ===
Holders of diplomatic passports, as well as holders of official, service, special and public affairs passports travelling with a government minister on an official visit, of the following countries, may enter without a visa:

- Albania
- Bosnia and Herzegovina
- China
- Colombia
- Indonesia
- Kosovo
- Kuwait
- Moldova
- Montenegro
- North Macedonia
- Peru
- Qatar
- Serbia
- South Africa
- Turkey

== Entry visa ==
Irish visa specimen

A traveller who does not qualify for one of the visa exemptions above is required to apply for an Irish visa in advance at an Irish embassy or consulate.

A single entry visa costs €60, whilst a multiple entry visa costs €100. However, spouses and certain family members of EEA and Swiss citizens are issued Irish visas free of charge.

In addition, visa applicants who are the nationals of following countries and territories are exempt from paying a fee:

- Bosnia and Herzegovina
- Ecuador
- Indonesia
- Ivory Coast
- Jamaica
- Kosovo
- Kyrgyzstan
- Montenegro
- Morocco
- North Macedonia
- Peru
- Serbia
- Sri Lanka
- Tunisia
- Uganda
- Zambia

All visa applicants aged 6 years and over, residing in China, Hong Kong, India, Nigeria, or Pakistan (irrespective of nationality) are required to submit their fingerprints as part of the visa application process.

=== Visa types ===
Current visa types are:

- Short Stay Visas
  - Business Visa — issued in order to attend meetings, trade shows, negotiate agreements or contracts and carry out fact finding missions in Ireland.
  - Conference/Event Visa
  - Exam Visa
  - Employment Visa — provided holding an approval Atypical Working Scheme Division of the Irish Naturalisation and Immigration Service.
  - Internship Visa
  - Join Ship Visa — for seafarers wishing to join a departing vessel in Ireland.
  - Marriage/Civil partnership Visa
  - Medical Treatment Visa — for an appointment with a private hospital in Ireland.
  - Performance/Tournament Visa
  - Training Visa
  - Visit (Family/Friends) — visiting friends or family who are resident in Ireland.
  - Visit Tourist
- Long Stay Visas
  - Employment Visa — for holders of employment permit from the Department of Jobs, Enterprise & Innovation: Critical Skills Employment Permit, Dependant/Partner/Spouse Employment Permit, General Employment Permit, Intra-Company Transfer Employment Permit, Contract for Services Employment Permit, Reactivation Employment Permit, Exchange Agreement Employment Permit, Sport and Cultural Employment Permit and Internship Employment Permit.
  - Scientific Researcher Visa — for researches seeking to carry out research under a "hosting agreement".
  - Employment "Van der Elst" Visa — for non-EU nationals employed in another EU country to provide temporary services to a company in another EU country on behalf of his company.
  - Join Family Visa
  - Lay Volunteer Visa
  - Minister of Religion
  - Study

== Transit visa ==
In general, a passenger who transits through an Irish airport to a destination in another country while remaining within the airport does not require a visa. However, citizens of the following countries are required to apply for a transit visa in advance at a cost of €25:

- Afghanistan
- Albania
- Bolivia
- Botswana
- Cuba
- DR Congo
- Dominica
- Eritrea
- Eswatini
- Ethiopia (Note: Holders of Ethiopian passports do not need an Irish transit visa if travelling from Ethiopia to the United States or Canada with permission to travel there, or from the United States or Canada to Ethiopia after a legal stay there.)
- Georgia
- Ghana
- Honduras
- Iran
- Iraq
- Lebanon
- Lesotho
- Moldova
- Nauru
- Nicaragua
- Nigeria
- Saint Kitts and Nevis
- Saint Lucia
- Somalia
- South Africa
- Sri Lanka
- Trinidad and Tobago
- Vanuatu
- Zimbabwe

== Entry and stay conditions for EU citizens ==
Directive 2004/38/EC of the European Parliament and of the Council of 29 April 2004 recognises the right of citizens of the Union and their family members to move and reside freely within the territory of the Member States and defines the right of free movement for citizens of the European Economic Area (EEA), which includes the European Union (EU) and the three European Free Trade Association (EFTA) members Iceland, Norway and Liechtenstein. Switzerland, which is a member of EFTA but not of the EEA, is not bound by the Directive but rather has a separate bilateral agreement on the free movement with the EU.

Citizens of all European Economic Area (EEA) member states and Switzerland holding a valid passport or national identity card enjoy freedom of movement rights in each other's territory and can enter and reside in the each other's territory without a visa.

If EU, EEA and Swiss nationals are unable to present a valid passport or national identity card at the border, they must nonetheless be afforded every reasonable opportunity to obtain the necessary documents or have them brought to them within a reasonable period of time or corroborate or prove by other means that he/she is covered by the right of free movement.

However, EU, EEA member states and Switzerland can refuse entry to an EU/EEA/Swiss national on public policy, public security or public health grounds where the person presents a "genuine, present and sufficiently serious threat affecting one of the fundamental interests of society". If the person has obtained permanent residence in the country where he/she seeks entry (a status which is normally attained after 5 years of residence), the member state can only expel him/her on serious grounds of public policy or public security. Where the person has resided for 10 years or is a minor, the member state can only expel him/her on imperative grounds of public security (and, in the case of minors, if expulsion is necessary in the best interests of the child, as provided for in the Convention on the Rights of the Child). Expulsion on public health grounds must relate to diseases with "epidemic potential" which have occurred less than 3 months from the person's the date of arrival in the Member State where he/she seeks entry.

=== Non-EEA/Swiss citizen family members ===
A family member of an EEA/Swiss citizen who is in possession of a residence permit indicating their status is exempt from the requirement to hold a visa for up to 90 days when entering the European Economic Area or Switzerland when they are accompanying their EEA/Swiss family member or are seeking to join them.

== eGates ==
eGates as a form of automated border control system were first introduced at Dublin Airport in December 2017. There are currently 10 eGates in each of Terminal 1 and Terminal 2 arrivals with an additional five eGates in the Transfers Facility. European Union citizens, British citizens, and EEA citizens over the age of 18 and using a full passport or Irish passport card may use eGates upon arrival to Dublin Airport, while the Transfer Area also facilitate US, Canadian, Australian, New Zealand and Japanese citizens (in addition to EU & EEA citizens), if they are not transferring to the UK.

== Reciprocity ==
Of the countries and territories outside the European single market and the United Kingdom, whose citizens are entitled to exercise free movement rights in Ireland, the following offer full reciprocal treatment to Irish citizens (i.e. visa-free access of at least 3 months): Andorra, Antigua and Barbuda, Argentina, Australia, Bahamas, Barbados, Brazil, Brunei, Canada, Chile, Costa Rica, El Salvador, Fiji, Grenada, Guatemala, Guyana, Hong Kong, Israel, Japan, Macau, Malaysia, Mexico, Monaco, New Zealand, Nicaragua, Panama, Paraguay, Saint Kitts and Nevis, San Marino, Singapore, Solomon Islands, South Korea, Taiwan, Trinidad and Tobago, Ukraine, United States, Uruguay, and Vatican City. However, some of these countries require Irish citizens to obtain an electronic authorisation before travel: Australia (eVisitor, no fee), Canada (eTA for travel by air, fee of 7 CAD), Israel (ETA-IL, fee of 25 ILS), New Zealand (NZeTA, fee of 117 NZD if applying via mobile app or 123 NZD otherwise, inclusive of the 100 NZD International Visitor Conservation and Tourism Levy) and the United States (ESTA, fee of 21 USD). Ireland does not require citizens of these countries to obtain an authorisation prior to arriving in Ireland.

Other countries and territories only offer partially reciprocal treatment to Irish citizens (i.e. visa-free access that is less than 3 months). The following countries permit Irish citizens to stay without a visa for up to 30 days (or 1 month) only: Belize, Kiribati, Maldives, Saint Vincent and the Grenadines, Seychelles (1 month, extendable to 12 months), Tonga, Tuvalu, and the United Arab Emirates. Also, the following countries permit Irish citizens to stay without a visa for less than 3 months: Saint Lucia (6 weeks) and Samoa (60 days).

== See also ==
- Common Travel Area
- Visa requirements for Irish citizens
- Visa requirements for European Union citizens
- Visa policy of the Schengen Area
