= Visa requirements for European Union citizens =

Administrative entry restrictions

Visa requirements for European Union citizens are administrative entry restrictions by the authorities of other countries placed on citizens of the European Union. They differ among countries. The European Union has achieved full reciprocity with certain countries.

Current member states of the European Union are Austria, Belgium, Bulgaria, Croatia, Cyprus, the Czech Republic, Denmark, Estonia, Finland, France, Germany, Greece, Hungary, Ireland, Italy, Latvia, Lithuania, Luxembourg, Malta, the Netherlands, Poland, Portugal, Romania, Slovakia, Slovenia, Spain and Sweden.

Member states' citizens enjoy freedom of movement in each other's territories. European Union citizens and European Free Trade Association (EFTA) nationals are not only visa-exempt but are legally entitled to enter and reside in each other's countries. The United Kingdom and the EU continued to maintain the same mutual policy until 31 December 2020.

The freedom of movement provisions do not apply to the overseas countries and territories (except Saint Barthélemy) and the Faroe Islands.

== Visa requirements map ==
Visa requirements for European Union citizens European Union (EU) Freedom of movement (EFTA) Visa not required / ETA for all EU citizens (Note: ETA required for Australia*, Canada if arriving by air, Israel, Kenya, Mozambique, New Zealand, Saint Kitts and Nevis, Seychelles, Sri Lanka, United Kingdom and the United States and its territories) (Note: Including Australian eVisitor.) Visa not required / ETA for some (1-27) EU citizens, different regime for others Visa on arrival / eVisa for all EU citizens (Note: A few countries do not offer eVisa, only Visa on arrival) Electronic visa application for all EU citizens Visa required for all EU citizens

== Visa free access ==
This table lists all countries, with source information as it is cited online, which citizens of at least one EU member state may enter without a visa on an ordinary passport. Information regarding visas on arrival and on exit fees is not listed in the table, regarding which, see the relevant section below.

Africa
Country	Visa not required	Visa required	Notes
Angola	All states.		30 days.
Botswana	All states.		90 days within 12 months.
Cape Verde	All states.		30 days.
Eswatini	All states.		30 days.
Gambia	All states.		90 days.
Kenya	All states (ETA).		90 days. Citizens of Cyprus can enter without an ETA.
Lesotho	All states.		14 days (90 days for Ireland and Malta).
Mauritius	All states.		90 days.
Morocco	All states.		90 days.
Rwanda	Belgium, Bulgaria, Cyprus, France, Greece, Luxembourg, Malta, Romania. (Note: Timatic lists these countries as being visa-exempt, while the government of Rwanda lists these countries as being eligible to receive a visa on arrival free of charge.)	All others	30 days.
Mozambique	Germany, France, Norway, Sweden, Finland, Italy, Ireland, Belgium, Netherlands, Portugal, Spain (ETA).	All others	30 days. An ETA is required.
São Tomé and Príncipe	All states.		15 days.
Senegal	All states.		90 days.
Seychelles	All states.		3 months.
South Africa	All states.		90 days (30 days for Cyprus, Poland).
Tanzania	Cyprus, Malta, Romania.	All others	30 days.
Tunisia	All others	Cyprus.	90 days (4 months for Germany, 2 months for Bulgaria, 1 month for Greece).
Uganda	Cyprus, Ireland, Malta.	All others	3 months.
Zambia	All states.		90 days for tourism, 30 days for business.
Zimbabwe	Cyprus, Malta.	All others	3 months.
Caribbean
Country	Visa not required	Visa required	Notes
Antigua and Barbuda	All states.		3 months (1 month for Ireland).
Bahamas	All states.		3 months (8 months for Belgium, Denmark, Greece, Italy, Luxembourg and the Netherlands).
Barbados	All states.		3 months (6 months for Ireland).
Dominica	All states.		90 days.
Dominican Republic	All states.		90 days.
Grenada	All states.		3 months.
Haiti	All states.		3 months.
Jamaica	All others	Bulgaria, Croatia, Romania.	90 days for Austria, Belgium, Denmark, Finland, Germany, Ireland, Italy, Luxembourg, Netherlands, Sweden; 30 days for others.
Saint Kitts and Nevis	All states (ETA).		3 months. An ETA is required.
Saint Lucia	All states		90 days.
Saint Vincent and the Grenadines	All states.		90 days.
Trinidad and Tobago	All states.		90 days.
Central and North America
Country	Visa not required	Visa required	Notes
Belize	All states.		
Canada	All states (eTA).		6 months, eTA required if arriving by air.
Costa Rica	All states.		180 days.
El Salvador	All states.		90 days.
Guatemala	All states.		90 days.
Honduras	All states.		90 days.
Mexico	All states.		180 days.
Nicaragua	All states.		90 days.
Panama	All states.		180 days.
United States	All others (VWP).	Bulgaria, Cyprus, Romania.	90 days on every arrival from overseas, ESTA required. Valid for multiple entries within 2 years or upon passport expiration, if sooner.
South America
Country	Visa not required	Visa required	Notes
Argentina	All states.		90 days.
Bolivia	All others	Cyprus.	90 days.
Brazil	All states.		90 days.
Chile	All states.		90 days.
Colombia	All states.		90 days.
Ecuador	All states.		90 days.
Guyana	All others.	Bulgaria, Croatia, Cyprus, Czech Republic, Estonia, Hungary, Latvia, Lithuania, Malta, Poland, Romania, Slovakia, Slovenia.	3 months.
Paraguay	All states.		90 days.
Peru	All states.		90 days (183 for Ireland).
Suriname	All states.		90 days. A fee of €50 must be paid online.
Uruguay	All states.		90 days, extendable once.
Venezuela	All states.		90 days, extendable once.
Asia
Country	Visa not required	Visa required	Notes
Brunei	All states.		90 days.
China	All others.	Czech Republic, Lithuania.	30 days.
Iran	Croatia.	All others	15 days within any 6-month period.
Israel	All states (ETA-IL).		3 months.
Japan	All states.		90 days, extendable once for Austria, Germany and Ireland.
Kazakhstan	All states.		30 days.
Kyrgyzstan	All states.		60 days.
Laos	Luxembourg.	All others	15 days.
Malaysia	All states.		90 days.
Mongolia	All states.		30 days.
Oman	All states.		14 days.
Philippines	All states.		30 days.
Qatar	All states.		90 days (30 days for Ireland).
South Korea	All states.		90 days. (30 days for Cyprus). K-ETA exemption until the end of 2026.
Singapore	All states.		90 days.
Sri Lanka	All states (ETA).		30 days. An ETA is required.
Tajikistan	All states.		30 days.
Thailand	All states.		60 days.
Timor-Leste	All others	Ireland	90 days.
United Arab Emirates	All states.		90 days (30 days for Ireland).
Uzbekistan	All states.		30 days.
Vietnam	Belgium, Bulgaria, Croatia, Czech Republic, Denmark, Finland, France, Germany, Hungary, Italy, Luxemburg, Netherlands, Poland, Romania, Slovakia, Slovenia, Spain, Sweden.	All others	45 days.
Europe
Country	Visa not required	Visa required	Notes
Albania	All states.		90 days.
Andorra	All states.		
Armenia	All states.		180 days.
Belarus	All states.		30 days (90 days for Latvia, Lithuania and Poland).
Bosnia and Herzegovina	All states.		90 days within 180 days.
Georgia	All states.		365 days / 1 year.
Iceland	All states		Freedom of movement.
Kosovo	All states.		90 days within 180 days.
Liechtenstein	All states		Freedom of movement.
Moldova	All states.		90 days within 180 days.
Montenegro	All states.		90 days within 180 days.
Monaco	All states.		
North Macedonia	All states.		90 days within 180 days.
Norway	All states		Freedom of movement.
San Marino	All states.		Freedom of movement for Italy.
Serbia	All states.		90 days within 180 days.
Switzerland	All states		Freedom of movement.
Turkey	All others	Cyprus.	90 days in any 180-day period.
Ukraine	All states.		90 days. Polish citizens can enter to Ukraine for 18 months visa free
United Kingdom	All states (ETA).		6 months. An ETA is required. Freedom of movement under Common Travel Area for Ireland.
Vatican City	All states.		
Oceania
Country	Visa not required	Visa required	Notes
Australia	All states (eVisitor).		90 days on each visit in 12-month period if granted. An (eVisitor) visa is required.
Fiji	All states.		4 months.
Kiribati	All states.		90 days (30 days for Ireland).
Marshall Islands	All states.		90 days.
Micronesia	All states.		90 days (30 days for Ireland).
New Zealand	All states (NZeTA).		90 days. An NZeTA is required.
Palau	All others	Ireland	90 days.
Samoa	All states.		90 days (60 days for Ireland).
Solomon Islands	All others	Ireland	90 days.
Tonga	All others	Ireland	90 days.
Tuvalu	All others	Ireland	90 days.
Vanuatu	All states.		90 days.

All European Union citizens can visit the following partially recognised countries or territories with autonomous immigration policies without a visa — in Europe: Kosovo, Transnistria, Turkish Republic of Northern Cyprus, in Asia: Hong Kong, Macau, Palestine, South Ossetia, Taiwan.

All European Union citizens always must arrange the visa prior to travel to (as of April 2026) Afghanistan (eVisa), Algeria, Azerbaijan (eVisa), Benin (eVisa), Bhutan (eVisa), Burkina Faso (eVisa), Cameroon (eVisa), Central African Republic, Chad (eVisa), Republic of the Congo, Democratic Republic of the Congo (eVisa), Côte d'Ivoire (eVisa), Cuba (eVisa), Equatorial Guinea (eVisa), Eritrea, Gabon (eVisa), Ghana, Guinea (eVisa), India (eVisa), Iran (eVisa), Iraq (eVisa), North Korea, Liberia (eVisa), Libya (eVisa), Mali, Mauritania (eVisa), Myanmar (eVisa), Nauru, Niger, Nigeria (eVisa), Pakistan (eVisa), Papua New Guinea (Easy Visitor Permit), Russia (eVisa), Somalia (eVisa), South Sudan (eVisa), Sudan, Togo (eVisa), Turkmenistan, Uganda (eVisa) and Yemen.

=== Reciprocity ===
As per Regulation No 539/2001 (amended by Regulation No 1289/2013) reciprocity is required from all Annex II countries and territories. That means that these countries must offer visa-free access for 90 days to all EU citizens (except citizens of Ireland) and to the citizens of Iceland, Liechtenstein, Norway and Switzerland. When this is not the case, the affected EU or Schengen member state is expected to notify the European Commission. Starting six months after the notification, the Commission may adopt an implementing act to suspend the visa-free regime for certain categories of nationals of the third country concerned, for a period of up to six months, with a possible prolongation by further periods of up to six months. If the Commission decides not to adopt such an act, it has to present a report explaining the reasons why it did not propose the measure. If after two years from the notification the third country is still requiring visas from citizens of one or more Member States, the Commission shall adopt a delegated act to re-impose the visa obligation on all citizens of the third country, for a period of 12 months. Either the European Parliament or the Council could oppose the entry into force of the delegated acts. All of the states that implement the common visa rules – including Iceland, Liechtenstein, Norway, Switzerland and Cyprus – may notify the European Commission about non-compliant third states.

The EU has achieved full reciprocity with the following countries (meaning the citizens of those countries may travel to all EU member states visa-free) — Antigua and Barbuda, Argentina, Australia, Bahamas, Barbados, Brazil, Brunei, Canada, Chile, Costa Rica, Dominica, El Salvador, Grenada, Guatemala, Honduras, Kiribati, Malaysia, Mexico, New Zealand, Panama, Paraguay, Saint Kitts and Nevis, Saint Lucia, Saint Vincent and the Grenadines, Samoa, Singapore, Solomon Islands, South Korea, Tonga, Trinidad and Tobago, Tuvalu, United Kingdom, Uruguay, Vanuatu.

Following countries are not implementing visa reciprocity fully, as of May 2026:

- United States: As of September 2021, Bulgarian, Cypriot and Romanian citizens are still required to apply for a visa to enter the US. Nonetheless, the US refuses to lift the requirements. On 3 March 2017, the European Parliament voted in favor to impose visa requirements on U.S. citizens in the future.
- Nicaragua: Reimposed a visa requirement for nationals of Croatia, Estonia, Iceland, Liechtenstein, Lithuania, Slovakia and Slovenia in February 2026.

According to a report from April 2015, the Commission dismissed notifications by both Bulgaria and Romania of a general visa requirement by Australia. It concluded that the Australian electronic visa 'manual processing' treatment should not be considered as equivalent to the Schengen visa application procedures and consequently will not be covered by the reciprocity mechanism. In its previous report the Commission also committed to assessing certain provisions of the US ESTA system — such as the application fee — and the Australian eVisitor system.

In October 2014, it was reported that the Comprehensive Economic and Trade Agreement with Canada might not be ratified by Bulgaria and Romania unless visa requirements were lifted for their citizens. In November 2014 Bulgarian Government also announced that it will not ratify the Transatlantic Trade and Investment Partnership unless the United States lifted visas for its citizens.

Australia still imposes some minor visa requirements on five nationalities under its eVisitor program. In the second quarter of 2024, tourism application approval rates were very low for nationals of Romania (62.6%), Croatia (71.5%), Bulgaria (78.1%), Lithuania (82.1%), and Latvia (84.8%). Since 2022, approval rates for citizens of these countries have ranged between 62 and 89%, while in all other Schengen states the approval rate has never fallen below 95%.

==== Special requirements ====
The following countries require electronic registrations for all citizens of the European Union who don't need a visa:

- Australia requires EU citizens to obtain an eVisitor, which is issued free of charge.
- Canada requires EU citizens to obtain an eTA if arriving by air. The application fee is 7 CAD.
- New Zealand requires EU citizens to obtain an NZeTA and IVL if arriving by air. The application fee is NZD 9 or 12 and NZD 35.
- United States requires eligible EU citizens to obtain an ESTA. The application fee is US$21.
Visa policy of the Schengen Area

Visa policy of Ireland

== Visa on arrival ==
The following countries provide visa on arrival to the citizens of the European Union. Some of these countries may be available for visa free access to some (*) or all other EU nationals (**) – for details see above. Some countries may not provide visa on arrival facilities at all entry points.

Visa on arrival for citizens of all states	Notes
Bahrain	14 days. 90 days for Irish citizens. BD 25.
Bangladesh	30 days. Fees vary widely by country (US$0–65). Extensions are possible.
Burundi	1 month.
Cambodia	30 days. US$20.
Comoros	50 US$. EUR 30.
Djibouti	23 US$
Egypt	30 days. US$25.
Ethiopia	30 days US$62.
Guinea Bissau	90 days. EUR 85.
Indonesia	30 days. US$35.
Jordan	30 days. Free of charge.
Kuwait	3 months. KWD 3.
Laos*	30 days. US$30.
Lebanon	1 month extendable for 2 additional months.
Madagascar	30 days. Free of charge.
Malawi	Fees vary.
Maldives	30 days. Free of charge. Extendable up to 90 days, MVR 750.
Mozambique*	30 days, extendable up to 60 days.
Namibia	90 days. N$400
Nepal	90 days. US$25–100.
Rwanda*	30 days. US$30.
Saudi Arabia	90 days. SAR 440.
Sierra Leone	US$80.
Syria	30 days.
Tanzania*	US$50 - US$100.
Zimbabwe*	3 months. US$30 - US$70.

Visa on arrival available to the citizens of some EU countries. Some of these countries may be available for visa free access to some (*) or all other EU nationals (**) – for details see above. Some countries may not provide visa on arrival facilities at all entry points.
Country	Visa on arrival available to citizens of	Notes
Jamaica**	Bulgaria, Croatia, Romania	US$100.
Palau**	Ireland	30 days. Free of charge. Extension possible, US$50.
East Timor**	Ireland	30 days. US$30.
Solomon Islands**	Ireland	3 months. Free of charge.
Tonga**	Ireland	31 days, extendable for further 6 months. Free of charge.
Tuvalu**	Ireland	1 month. Free of charge.

== Limited visa on arrival ==
- Iraq – Holders of ordinary passports of all EU member states may obtain a visa on arrival for Iraqi Kurdistan valid for 15 days when arriving through the Erbil International Airport or Sulaimaniyah International Airport.
- Pakistan - All EU nationals may obtain visa on arrival when travelling on business. They must have a local sponsor who must obtain an approval from the immigration authorities at the port of arrival (Islamabad, Lahore, Peshawar, Quetta or Karachi airports) and a recommendation letter from country of residence or invitation letter from Pakistan.
- Vietnam - Visitors can obtain a visa on arrival for a maximum stay of 1 or 3 months if they are holders of an approval letter issued and stamped by the Vietnamese Immigration Department (obtainable online through travel agencies for a fee) and if arriving only at airports in Hanoi, Ho Chi Minh City or Da Nang. All travellers can visit Phú Quốc without a visa for up to 30 days.

== Online visas/e-Visas ==
The following countries provide electronic visas to the citizens of the European Union.

Country	Notes
Afghanistan	Available to all EU citizens. Visitors must arrive at Kabul International.
Azerbaijan	Available to all EU citizens.
Bahrain	Available to all EU citizens. Visa on arrival also available.
Benin	Available to all EU citizens.
Bhutan	Available to all EU citizens.
Burkina Faso	Available to all EU citizens.
Cambodia	Available to all EU citizens. Visa on arrival also available.
Cameroon	Available to all EU citizens.
Chad	Available to all EU citizens.
Cuba	Available to all EU citizens.
Djibouti	Available to all EU citizens. Visa on arrival also available.
DR Congo	Available to all EU citizens.
Ethiopia	Available to all EU citizens. Visa on arrival also available.
Equatorial Guinea	Available to all EU citizens.
Gabon	Available to all EU citizens.
Ghana	Available to all EU citizens.
Guinea	Available to all EU citizens.
Guyana	Only required for non-exempt nationals.
India	Available to all EU citizens.
Indonesia	Available to all EU citizens. Visa on arrival also available.
Iraq	Available to all EU citizens.
Iran	Available to all EU citizens. Additionally, passengers arriving at the international airports of Bandar Abbas, Isfahan, Kish Island, Mashad, Qeshm Island, Shiraz, Tabriz, Tehran, Urmia, Ahvaz, Kerman or Lar, who already have made an application, at least two days before arrival, at the Iranian Ministry of Foreign Affair's E-Visa website, and present the submission notification at the airport's visa desk, may obtain a visa on arrival.
Ivory Coast	Available to all EU citizens.
Kuwait	Available to all EU citizens. Visa on arrival also available.
Laos	Available to all EU citizens. Visa on arrival also available.
Liberia	Available to citizens of countries that do not have a Liberian embassy.
Libya	Available to all EU citizens.
Madagascar	Available to all EU citizens. Visa on arrival also available.
Malawi	Available to all EU citizens. Visa on arrival also available.
Mauritania	Available to all EU citizens.
Mozambique	Available to all EU citizens. Visa on arrival also available. Some EU citizens do not require a visa.
Myanmar	Available to all EU citizens.
Namibia	Available to all EU citizens. Visa on arrival also available.
Nepal	Available to all EU citizens. Visa on arrival also available.
Nigeria	Available to all EU citizens.
Papua New Guinea	Available to all EU citizens.
Russia	Available to all EU citizens.
Rwanda	Available to all EU citizens. Visa on arrival also available. Some EU citizens do not require a visa.
Saudi Arabia	Available to all EU citizens.
Sierra Leone	Available to all EU citizens. Visa on arrival also available.
Somalia	Available to all EU citizens.
South Sudan	Available to all EU citizens.
Syria	Available to all EU citizens. Visa on arrival also available. The platform is no longer operational.
Tanzania	Available to all EU citizens. Visa on arrival also available. Some EU citizens do not require a visa.
Togo	Available to all EU citizens.
Turkey	Available to the citizens of Cyprus. Other EU citizens do not require a visa.
Uganda	Available to all EU citizens. Some EU citizens do not require a visa.
Vietnam	Available to all EU citizens. Some of the eVisa eligible nationals do not require a visa for visits up to 45 days.
Zimbabwe	Available to all EU citizens. Visa on arrival also available. Some EU citizens do not require a visa.

== Other ==
- Mainland China – As of 2025 all EU citizens transiting through at one of eligible ports of entry may leave the port for up to 240 hours. Visa-free access to Hainan Island for up to 30 days is granted to the all EU nationals.
- Zambia / Zimbabwe - a universal KAZA visa that is valid for both countries can be issued on arrival to citizens of Austria, Belgium, Czech Republic, Denmark, Finland, France, Germany, Greece, Hungary, Italy, Luxembourg, Netherlands, Poland, Portugal, Slovakia, Slovenia, Spain and Sweden.
- Kenya / Rwanda / Uganda - an East Africa Borderless Visa: Travelers from any country can obtain a multiple entry visa that allows entry to these three countries for tourism over period of 90 days. Visa must be first used in the country that issued it.

== Non-ordinary passports ==
In addition to visa requirements for normal passport holders certain countries have specific visa requirements towards diplomatic and various official passport holders:

Visa-free access for holders of various categories of official passports
Country	Visa-free access
Austria	Azerbaijan (diplomatic or service passports), Egypt (diplomatic or service passports), Indonesia (diplomatic or service passports), Ivory Coast (diplomatic or service passports), Pakistan (diplomatic or service passports), Russia (diplomatic passports), Turkey (diplomatic, official, service or special passports)
Belgium	Pakistan (diplomatic or service passports), Russia (diplomatic passports), Turkey (diplomatic, official, service or special passports)
Bulgaria	Azerbaijan (diplomatic or service passports), China (diplomatic or service passports), India (diplomatic or official passports), Indonesia (diplomatic or official passports), Iran (diplomatic or service passports), Kazakhstan (diplomatic or service passports), Kuwait (diplomatic or service passports), Mauritania (diplomatic and service passports), Mongolia (diplomatic or official passports), North Korea (diplomatic or service passports), Qatar (diplomatic passports), Russia (diplomatic and service passports), South Africa (diplomatic, official or service passports), Turkmenistan (diplomatic or service passports), Vietnam (diplomatic, official, service or special passports)
Croatia	Algeria (diplomatic passports), Azerbaijan (diplomatic or service passports), China (diplomatic, official or service passports), Cuba (diplomatic, official or service passports), Egypt (diplomatic, official, service or special passports), India (diplomatic or official passports), Indonesia (diplomatic or service passports), Iran (diplomatic or service passports), Kazakhstan (diplomatic or service passports), Russia (diplomatic and service passports), South Africa (diplomatic, official or service passports), Vietnam (diplomatic or service passports)
Cyprus	China (diplomatic or service passports), Cuba (diplomatic or service passports), Guyana (diplomatic or service passports), Egypt (diplomatic, official, service or special passports), India (diplomatic or official passports), Iran (diplomatic or service passports), Kazakhstan (diplomatic or service passports), Kuwait (diplomatic or service passports), Mongolia (diplomatic or official passports), Qatar (diplomatic passports), Russia (diplomatic and service passports), South Africa (diplomatic, official or service passports), United Arab Emirates (diplomatic, service or special passports), Vietnam (diplomatic or service passports)
Czech Republic	Egypt (diplomatic, official, service or special passports), Laos (diplomatic or official passports), Mongolia (diplomatic or official passports), Pakistan (diplomatic or service passports), Russia (diplomatic passports), Tunisia (diplomatic passports), Vietnam (diplomatic passports), Yemen (diplomatic, official, service or special passports)
Denmark	Egypt (diplomatic or service passports), India (diplomatic or official passports), Kazakhstan (diplomatic passports), Pakistan (diplomatic or service passports), Russia (diplomatic passports)
Estonia	Azerbaijan (diplomatic passports), Bangladesh (diplomatic or official passports), Kazakhstan (diplomatic passports), Russia (diplomatic passports)
Finland	Kazakhstan (diplomatic passports), Pakistan (diplomatic or service passports), Russia (diplomatic passports)
France	Algeria (diplomatic passports), Angola (diplomatic or service passports), Azerbaijan (diplomatic passports), Kazakhstan (diplomatic passports), Mongolia (diplomatic or official passports), Qatar (diplomatic or service passports), Russia (diplomatic passports), Vietnam (diplomatic passports)
Germany	Algeria (diplomatic passports), Ghana (diplomatic, official, or service passports), India (diplomatic passports), Kazakhstan (diplomatic passports), Pakistan (diplomatic passports), Qatar (diplomatic passports), Russia (diplomatic passports), Vietnam (diplomatic passports)
Greece	Algeria (diplomatic or service passports), India (diplomatic passports), Iran (diplomatic passports), Pakistan (diplomatic passports), Russia (diplomatic passports)
Hungary	Algeria (diplomatic passports), Azerbaijan (diplomatic or service passports), Belarus (diplomatic or service passports), China (diplomatic or service passports), Cuba (diplomatic or service passports), Egypt (diplomatic passports), India (diplomatic or official passports), Indonesia (diplomatic or service passports), Iran (diplomatic passports), Kazakhstan (diplomatic or service passports), Laos (diplomatic or official passports), Mongolia (diplomatic or official passports), Russia (diplomatic and service passports), South Africa (diplomatic, official or service passports), Tajikistan (diplomatic or service passports), Turkmenistan (diplomatic or service passports), Uzbekistan (diplomatic passports), Vietnam (diplomatic, official, service or special passports), Yemen (diplomatic passports)
Ireland	Kuwait (diplomatic or official passports)
Italy	Algeria (diplomatic or service passports), Angola (diplomatic or service passports), Azerbaijan (diplomatic or service passports), Cameroon (diplomatic or official passports), Egypt (diplomatic, official, service or special passports), Kazakhstan (diplomatic passports), Kuwait (diplomatic passports), Libya (diplomatic, official or service passports), Niger (diplomatic passports), Qatar (diplomatic, service or special passports), Uganda (diplomatic passports), Russia (diplomatic passports), Vietnam (diplomatic passports)
Latvia	Mongolia (diplomatic or service passports), Russia (diplomatic passports)
Lithuania	Azerbaijan (diplomatic passports), China (diplomatic or service passports), India (diplomatic passports), Kazakhstan (diplomatic passports), Russia (diplomatic passports)
Luxembourg	Pakistan (diplomatic passports), Russia (diplomatic passports)
Malta	China (diplomatic or service passports), Kazakhstan (diplomatic passports), Libya (diplomatic, official or service passports), Russia (diplomatic passports)
Netherlands	Pakistan (diplomatic passports), Russia (diplomatic passports), Turkey (diplomatic, official, service or special passports)
Poland	Azerbaijan (diplomatic passports), Belarus (diplomatic passports), China (diplomatic or service passports), Indonesia (diplomatic or service passports), Iran (diplomatic passports), Mongolia (diplomatic or official passports), Kazakhstan (diplomatic passports), Laos (diplomatic or official passports), Russia (diplomatic passports), South Africa (diplomatic, official or service passports), Turkey (diplomatic, official, service or special passports), United Arab Emirates (diplomatic passports), Vietnam (diplomatic passports)
Portugal	Algeria (diplomatic, service or special passports), Angola (diplomatic, service or special passports), Azerbaijan (diplomatic, service or special passports), Republic of the Congo (diplomatic passports), Indonesia (diplomatic, official or service passports), Kazakhstan (diplomatic passports), Kuwait (diplomatic, service or special passports), Mozambique (diplomatic, official or service passports), Qatar (diplomatic or special passports), Russia (diplomatic passports), São Tomé and Príncipe (diplomatic or service passports), Turkey (diplomatic or service passports)
Romania	Algeria (diplomatic or service passports), Azerbaijan (diplomatic or service passports), Belarus (diplomatic or service passports), China (diplomatic or service passports), Ghana (diplomatic, official or service passports), India (diplomatic passports), Iran (diplomatic passports), Kazakhstan (diplomatic or service passports), Mongolia (diplomatic or official passports), Pakistan (diplomatic or official passports), Russia (diplomatic and service passports), South Africa (diplomatic, official or service passports), Tajikistan (diplomatic or service passports), Thailand (diplomatic or official passports), Turkmenistan (diplomatic or service passports), Uzbekistan (diplomatic, official or service passports), Vietnam (diplomatic or service passports)
Slovakia	Algeria (diplomatic or service passports), Azerbaijan (diplomatic or service passports), Belarus (diplomatic or service passports), China (diplomatic, service or special passports), Egypt (diplomatic, official, service or special passports), Indonesia (diplomatic or service passports), Kazakhstan (diplomatic or service passports), Mongolia (diplomatic or official passports), Russia (diplomatic and service passports), South Africa (diplomatic, official or service passports), Uzbekistan (diplomatic or service passports), Vietnam (diplomatic passports)
Slovenia	Azerbaijan (diplomatic passports), Cuba (diplomatic or service passports), Egypt (diplomatic, official, service or special passports), Indonesia (diplomatic or service passports), Kazakhstan (diplomatic passports), Libya (diplomatic, official or service passports), Russia (diplomatic passports), South Africa (diplomatic, official or service passports), Vietnam (diplomatic or service passports)
Spain	Algeria (diplomatic or service passports), Egypt (diplomatic, official, service or special passports), Kazakhstan (diplomatic passports), Kuwait (diplomatic passports), Russia (diplomatic passports), Turkey (diplomatic, official, service or special passports), Vietnam (diplomatic passports)
Sweden	Russia (diplomatic passports)

Cape Verde, Ethiopia, Mali and Zimbabwe grant visa-free access to holders of diplomatic or service passports issued to nationals of any country. Mauritania and Senegal grant visa-free access to holders of diplomatic passports issued to nationals of any country (except Italy for Mauritania). Bahrain, Bangladesh, Burkina Faso, Cambodia and South Sudan allow holders of diplomatic, official, service and special passports issued to nationals of any country to obtain a visa on arrival.

== Non-visa restrictions ==
=== Blank passport pages ===
Many countries require a minimum number of blank pages to be available in the passport being presented, typically one or two pages. Endorsement pages, which often appear after the visa pages, are not counted as being valid or available.

=== Vaccination ===
Cover of the new International Certificate of Vaccination issued by the Bureau of Quarantine in the Philippines since 2021

The African countries of Angola, Benin, Burkina Faso, Burundi, Cameroon, Central African Republic, Democratic Republic of the Congo, Republic of the Congo, Côte d'Ivoire, Gabon, Ghana, Guinea-Bissau, Mali, Niger, Sierra Leone and Togo, South Sudan and Uganda, along with French Guiana in South America, require all incoming passengers older than nine months to one year, to have a current International Certificate of Vaccination or Prophylaxis.

Some other countries require vaccination only if the passenger is coming from an infected area or has visited one recently or has transited for 12 hours in those countries: Algeria, Botswana, Cabo Verde, Chad, Djibouti, Egypt, Eswatini, Ethiopia, Gambia, Ghana, Guinea, Lesotho, Libya, Equatorial Guinea, Eritrea, Madagascar, Malawi, Mauritania, Mauritius, Mozambique, Namibia, Nigeria, Papua New Guinea, Seychelles, Somalia, South Africa, Sudan, Tunisia, Uganda, Tanzania, Zambia and Zimbabwe.

=== Passport validity length ===
Very few countries, such as Paraguay, just require a valid passport on arrival.

However many countries and groupings now require only an identity card – especially from their neighbours. Other countries may have special bilateral arrangements that depart from the generality of their passport validity length policies to shorten the period of passport validity required for each other's citizens or even accept passports that have already expired (but not been cancelled).

Some countries, such as Japan, Ireland and the United Kingdom, require a passport valid throughout the period of the intended stay.

In the absence of specific bilateral agreements, countries requiring passports to be valid for at least 6 more months on arrival include Afghanistan, Algeria, Anguilla, Bahrain, Bhutan, Botswana, British Virgin Islands, Brunei, Cambodia, Cameroon, Cape Verde, Cayman Islands, Central African Republic, Chad, Comoros, Costa Rica, Côte d'Ivoire, Curaçao, Ecuador, Egypt, El Salvador, Equatorial Guinea, Fiji, Gabon, Guinea Bissau, Guyana, Haiti, India, Indonesia, Iran, Iraq, Israel, Jordan, Kenya, Kiribati, Kuwait, Laos, Madagascar, Malaysia, Marshall Islands, Mongolia, Myanmar, Namibia, Nepal, Nicaragua, Nigeria, Oman, Palau, Papua New Guinea, Peru, Philippines, Qatar, Rwanda, Samoa, Saudi Arabia, Singapore, Solomon Islands, Somalia, Sri Lanka, Sudan, Suriname, Tanzania, Thailand, Timor-Leste, Tokelau, Tonga, Turkey, Tuvalu, Uganda, United Arab Emirates, Vanuatu, Venezuela, and Vietnam.

Countries requiring passports valid for at least 4 months on arrival include Micronesia and Zambia.

Countries requiring passports with a validity of at least 3 months beyond the date of intended departure include Azerbaijan, Bosnia and Herzegovina, Honduras, Montenegro, Nauru, Moldova and New Zealand. Similarly, the EEA countries of Iceland, Liechtenstein, Norway, all European Union countries (except Ireland) together with Switzerland also require 3 months validity beyond the date of the bearer's intended departure unless the bearer is an EEA or Swiss national.

Countries requiring passports valid for at least 3 months on arrival include Albania, North Macedonia, Panama, and Senegal.

Bermuda requires passports to be valid for at least 45 days upon entry.

Countries that require a passport validity of at least one month beyond the date of intended departure include Eritrea, Hong Kong, Lebanon, Macau, the Maldives and South Africa.

==== Maximum passport age ====
Countries of the Schengen area require non-EU passports to be less than 10 years old upon entry.

=== Criminal record ===
Some countries, including Australia, Canada, Fiji, New Zealand and the United States, routinely deny entry to non-citizens who have a criminal record, while others impose restrictions depending on the type of conviction and the length of the sentence.

=== Persona non grata ===
The government of a country can declare a diplomat persona non grata, banning them from entering the country or expelling them if they have already entered. In non-diplomatic use, the authorities of a country may also declare a foreigner persona non grata permanently or temporarily, usually because of unlawful activity.

=== Israeli stamps ===
Kuwait, Lebanon, Libya, and Yemen do not allow entry to people with passport stamps from Israel or whose passports have either a used or an unused Israeli visa, or where there is evidence of previous travel to Israel such as entry or exit stamps from neighbouring border posts in transit countries such as Jordan and Egypt.

To circumvent this Arab League boycott of Israel, the Israeli immigration services have now mostly ceased to stamp foreign nationals' passports on either entry to or exit from Israel (unless the entry is for some work-related purposes). Since 15 January 2013, Israel no longer stamps foreign passports at Ben Gurion Airport. Passports are still (as of 22 June 2017) stamped at Erez when passing into and out of Gaza.

Iran refuses admission to holders of passports containing an Israeli visa or stamp that is less than 12 months old.

=== Biometrics ===
Several countries mandate that all travellers, or all foreign travellers, be fingerprinted on arrival and will refuse admission to or even arrest travellers who refuse to comply. In some countries, such as the United States, this may apply even to transit passengers who merely wish to change planes rather than go landside.

Fingerprinting countries/regions include Afghanistan, Argentina, Brunei, Cambodia, China, Ethiopia, Ghana, Guinea, India, Japan, Kenya (both fingerprints and a photo are taken), Malaysia upon entry and departure, Mongolia, Saudi Arabia, the Schengen Area, Singapore, South Korea, Taiwan, Thailand, Uganda, the United Arab Emirates and the United States.

Many countries also require a photo be taken of people entering the country. The United States, which does not fully implement exit control formalities at its land frontiers (although long mandated by its own legislation), intends to implement facial recognition for passengers departing from international airports to identify people who overstay their visa.

Together with fingerprint and face recognition, iris scanning is one of three biometric identification technologies internationally standardised since 2006 by the International Civil Aviation Organization (ICAO) for use in e-passports and the United Arab Emirates conducts iris scanning on visitors who need to apply for a visa. The United States Department of Homeland Security has announced plans to greatly increase the biometric data it collects at US borders. In 2018, Singapore began trials of iris scanning at three land and maritime immigration checkpoints.

== Passport rankings ==
Passport rankings by the number of countries and territories their holders could visit without a visa or by obtaining visa on arrival in July 2024 according to the Henley Passport Index were as follows (ranked): French, German, Italian and Spanish — 192 countries and territories (2nd); Austrian, Dutch, Finnish, Irish, Luxembourgish, Swedish — 191 (3rd); Belgian, Danish — 190 (4th); Portuguese — 189 (5th); Greek, Polish — 188 (6th); Czech, Hungarian, Maltese — 187 (7th); Estonian, Lithuanian — 185 (9th); Latvian, Slovak, Slovenian — 184 (10th); Croatian — 183 (11th); Cypriot — 178 (13th); Bulgarian, Romanian — 177 (14th). All EU passports are ranked within the top 15 positions. Passports of the European Free Trade Association countries rank similarly, Norwegian, Swiss — 190 (4th); Icelandic — 184 (10th) and Liechtenstein — 182 (12th), while the passports of the candidate states rank lower Serbian — 140 (34th); Montenegrin, North Macedonian — 128 (41st); Albanian, Bosnia and Herzegovina — 123 (43rd) and Turkish — 116 (45th). European microstates rank high: Monaco — 178 (13th); San Marino — 172 (16th); Andorra — 171 (17th) and Vatican City — 155 (25th).

== Future ==
European Commission proposed a visa-free travel for 16 island nations in 2012. This proposal foresees that the visa exemption will be reciprocated through visa waiver agreements, ensuring a visa free regime for all EU citizens who wish to travel to these countries. The island nations in question are Caribbean island nations – Dominica, Grenada, Saint Lucia, Saint Vincent and the Grenadines and Trinidad and Tobago, and Pacific island nations – Kiribati, the Marshall Islands, Micronesia, Nauru, Palau, Samoa, the Solomon Islands, Timor-Leste, Tonga, Tuvalu and Vanuatu. The list was expanded in 2013 with Colombia, Peru and the United Arab Emirates. Most of these countries already provide visa-free or visa on arrival access in some form to the EU citizens. As of 2020, visa-free agreements have been concluded with all listed nations except Nauru.

== Freedom of movement within the EEA and Switzerland ==
Directive 2004/38/EC of the European Parliament and of the Council of 29 April 2004 recognises the right of citizens of the Union and their family members to move and reside freely within the territory of the Member States defines the right of free movement for citizens of the European Economic Area (EEA), which includes the European Union (EU) and the three European Free Trade Association (EFTA) members Iceland, Norway and Liechtenstein. Switzerland, which is a member of EFTA but not of the EEA, is not bound by the Directive but rather has a separate multilateral, sectoral agreement on the free movement with the EU and its member states.

Citizens of all European Economic Area (EEA) member states and Switzerland holding a valid passport or national identity card enjoy freedom of movement rights in each other's territory and can enter and reside in the each other's territory without a visa.

If EU, EEA and Swiss nationals are unable to present a valid passport or national identity card at the border, they must nonetheless be afforded every reasonable opportunity to obtain the necessary documents or have them brought to them within a reasonable period of time or corroborate or prove by other means that he/she is covered by the right of free movement.

However, EU, EEA member states and Switzerland can refuse entry to an EU/EEA/Swiss national on public policy, public security or public health grounds where the person presents a "genuine, present and sufficiently serious threat affecting one of the fundamental interests of society". If the person has obtained permanent residence in the country where he/she seeks entry (a status which is normally attained after 5 years of residence), the member state can only expel him/her on serious grounds of public policy or public security. Where the person has resided for 10 years or is a minor, the member state can only expel him/her on imperative grounds of public security (and, in the case of minors, if expulsion is necessary in the best interests of the child, as provided for in the Convention on the Rights of the Child). Expulsion on public health grounds must relate to diseases with 'epidemic potential' which have occurred less than 3 months from the person's the date of arrival in the Member State where he/she seeks entry.

A family member of an EU/EEA/Swiss citizen who is in possession of a residence permit indicating their status is exempt from the requirement to hold a visa when entering the European Union, European Economic Area or Switzerland when they are accompanying their EU/EEA/Swiss family member or are seeking to join them.

=== Special regulations ===
- A citizen of one EU or EFTA country can live and work indefinitely in the other EU and EFTA countries. However, countries can limit the right to vote and work in certain sensitive fields (such as government, police, military) to local citizens only.
- Immigrants from another EU or EFTA country can be refused welfare benefits. Welfare fraud may result in deportation.
- Economically inactive EU citizens who want to stay longer than three months in another Member State have to fulfill the condition of having health insurance and "sufficient resources" in order not to become an "unreasonable burden" for the social assistance system of the host Member State, which otherwise can legitimately expel them.

Country-specific regulations

- Cyprus has been divided into a southern (Greek) and northern (Turkish) region since the Turkish invasion of northern Cyprus on July 20, 1974. Northern Cyprus is not generally recognized by the international community as a sovereign state. The United Nations considers the declaration of independence by Northern Cyprus as legally invalid. The United Nations recognises Northern Cyprus as territory of the Republic of Cyprus under Turkish occupation. Turkey permits Citizens of Northern Cyprus to live and work in Turkey under the same requirements as Turkish citizens and provides an alien's passport for Northern Cyprus citizens.
- The Faroe Islands belong to Denmark, but not the EU, so their inhabitants are Danish citizens, but not EU citizens. Greenland left the EC in 1985, but Greenlanders are considered EU citizens. In practice, citizens of Faroe Islands and Greenland can choose between local and "European" passports and can become "full" EU citizens by moving to and living permanently in Denmark. The Nordic Passport Union allows citizens of Denmark (including the Faroe Islands), Sweden, Norway, Finland, and Iceland to travel and reside in other Nordic countries (including the Faroe Islands and Greenland) without a passport or a residence permit. Citizens of other EU/EFTA countries can visit the Faroe Islands and Greenland visa-free for 90 days.
- EU/EFTA citizens can enter and reside for an unlimited period without a visa in Overseas France. They may use their national identity card instead of their passport as a travel document to enter any French territory. They may also work freely in the parts of Overseas France that are part of the European Union (overseas departments and regions, and Saint Martin), but those who are not nationals of France need a permit to work in other parts such as French Polynesia, New Caledonia, and Wallis and Futuna.
- Although all Dutch nationals have the right of abode in the European Netherlands, right of abode in the Dutch Caribbean is limited to those who have a connection to the region. Other Dutch can enter the region visa-free for a maximum of 6 months. The identity card BES and the cedula of Aruba, Curaçao and Sint Maarten are valid for entering Bonaire, Sint Eustatius or Saba, but the Dutch identity card is not. Citizens of other EU/EFTA countries can visit Aruba, Curaçao, Sint Maarten and the Caribbean Netherlands visa-free for 90 days.
- Irish and British citizens enjoy freedom of movement in each other's country (Common Travel Area).

== Right to consular protection ==
When in a non-EU country, EU citizens whose country maintains no embassy there have the right to get consular protection from the embassy of any other EU country present there. However, EU citizens living and working an EU country other than the one of their citizenship must generally contact the embassy of the country of their citizenship (if there is one in the non-EU country concerned), not the one of their host country.

As of 2014, there are 16 non-EU countries where there is only one embassy of an EU country: Barbados (EU delegation), Belize (EU office), Central African Republic (France, EU delegation), Comoros (France), Gambia (EU office), Guyana (EU delegation), San Marino (Italy), São Tomé and Príncipe (Portugal), Timor-Leste (Portugal, EU delegation), and Vanuatu (France, EU delegation).

As of 2014, the following 18 non-EU countries have no embassy of an EU country: Bahamas, Bhutan (Denmark Liaison office), Dominica, Grenada, Kiribati, Lesotho (EU delegation), Liechtenstein, Maldives, Marshall Islands, Micronesia, Nauru, Palau, Saint Kitts and Nevis, Saint Vincent and the Grenadines, Samoa (EU office), Swaziland (EU office), Tonga, and Tuvalu.

== See also ==
- Passports of the European Union
- Visa policy of the Schengen Area
- Visa policy of Ireland
- Visa requirements for Estonian non-citizens
- Visa requirements for Latvian non-citizens
