= Irish nationality law =

Irish Nationality and Citizenship Act, 1956

Oireachtas
- Long title: An Act to make provision for the acquisition and loss of Irish nationality and citizenship.
- Citation: No. 26 of 1956
- Territorial extent: Republic of Ireland; Northern Ireland
- Enacted by: Dáil Éireann
- Enacted: 11 July 1956 (with amendments from the Seanad)
- Enacted by: Seanad Éireann
- Enacted: 5 July 1956
- Signed by: President Seán T. O'Kelly
- Signed: 17 July 1956
- Commenced: 17 July 1956
- Administered by: Department of Justice, Home Affairs and Migration

Legislative history

Initiating chamber: Dáil Éireann
- Bill title: Irish Nationality and Citizenship Bill, 1955
- Introduced by: James Everett, Minister for Justice
- First reading: 13 July 1955
- Second reading: 29 February 1956
- Third reading: 10 April 1956

Revising chamber: Seanad Éireann
- Bill title: Irish Nationality and Citizenship Bill, 1955
- Second reading: 16 May 1956
- Third reading: 5 July 1956

Repeals
- Irish Nationality and Citizenship Act, 1935
- Status: Amended

The primary law governing nationality of Ireland is the Irish Nationality and Citizenship Act, 1956, which came into force on 17 July 1956. Ireland is a member state of the European Union (EU), and all Irish nationals are EU citizens. They are entitled to free movement rights in EU and European Free Trade Association (EFTA) countries, and may vote in elections to the European Parliament for the three Irish constituencies.

All persons born in the Republic before 1 January 2005 automatically received citizenship at birth regardless of the nationalities of their parents. Individuals born in the country since that date receive Irish citizenship at birth if at least one of their parents is an Irish citizen or entitled to be one. They are also entitled to citizenship if a parent is a British citizen, has no time limit on their stay in either the Republic or Northern Ireland, or has been domiciled on the island of Ireland for at least three of the preceding four years. Persons born in Northern Ireland are usually entitled to – but not automatically granted – Irish citizenship, largely under the same terms. Foreign nationals may become Irish citizens by naturalisation after meeting a minimum residence requirement, usually five years. The president of Ireland may also grant honorary citizenship, which entails the same rights and duties as normal citizenship, although this is rare.

Ireland as a whole was previously part of the United Kingdom, and Irish people were British subjects. After most of Ireland gained independence as the Irish Free State in 1922 and departed from the Commonwealth of Nations in 1949, Irish citizens no longer hold British nationality. However, they continue to have favoured status in the United Kingdom and are largely exempt from British immigration law, eligible to vote in UK elections, and able to stand for public office there.

== Terminology ==
The distinction between the meaning of the terms citizenship and nationality is not always clear in the English language and differs by country. Generally, nationality refers to a person's legal belonging to a sovereign state and is the common term used in international treaties when referring to members of a country, while citizenship usually means the set of rights and duties a person has in that nation. This distinction is more clearly defined in many non-English-speaking jurisdictions than in the Anglosphere. In the Irish context, there is little distinction between the two terms and they are used interchangeably.

== History ==
=== Pre-independence context ===
Since the Anglo-Norman invasion of Ireland in the late 12th century, England has been politically and militarily involved with the island. English control was tenuous until the Tudor conquest in the 16th century, during which the entire island was absorbed into the Kingdom of Ireland. After passage of the Acts of Union 1800, Ireland was merged with the Kingdom of Great Britain to form the United Kingdom of Great Britain and Ireland. Accordingly, British nationality law applied in Ireland. Any person born in Ireland, as a constituent part of the United Kingdom, or anywhere else within Crown dominions was a natural-born British subject. Natural-born subjects were considered to owe perpetual allegiance to the sovereign, and could not voluntarily renounce British subject status until renunciation was first permitted in 1870.

British nationality law during this time was uncodified and did not have a standard set of regulations, relying instead on past precedent and common law. Until the mid-19th century, it was unclear whether rules for naturalisation in the United Kingdom were applicable elsewhere in the British Empire. Colonies had wide discretion in developing their own procedures and requirements for naturalisation up to that point. In 1847, the British Parliament formalised a distinction between subjects who naturalised in the UK and those who did so in other territories. Individuals who naturalised in the UK were deemed to have received the status by imperial naturalisation, which was valid throughout the Empire. Those naturalising in colonies were said to have gone through local naturalisation and were given subject status valid only within the relevant territory; a subject who locally naturalised in Canada was a British subject there, but not in the UK or New Zealand. When travelling outside the Empire, British subjects who were locally naturalised in a colony were still entitled to imperial protection.

The British Parliament brought regulations for British subject status into codified statute law for the first time with passage of the British Nationality and Status of Aliens Act 1914. British subject status was standardised as a common nationality across the Empire. Dominions that adopted Part II of this Act as part of local legislation were authorised to grant subject status to aliens by imperial naturalisation.

=== Partition and lingering imperial ties ===
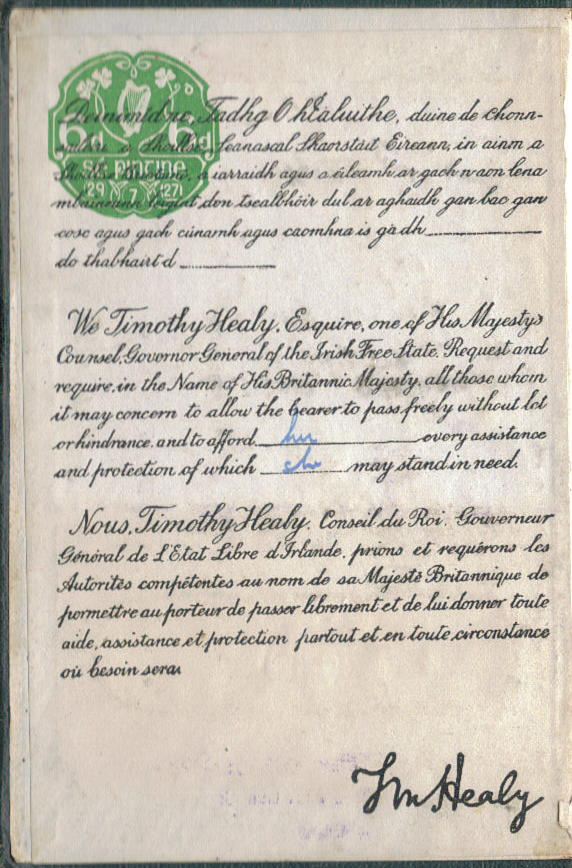
Request page of an Irish Free State passport issued in 1927

Resistance to the Union and desire for local self-governance led to the Irish War of Independence. Following the war, the island of Ireland was partitioned. Southern Ireland became the Irish Free State in 1922, while Northern Ireland remains part of the United Kingdom. When the Constitution of the Irish Free State came into force on 6 December 1922, any individual domiciled in Ireland automatically became an Irish citizen if they were born in Ireland, born to at least one parent who was born in Ireland, or living in Ireland for at least seven years prior to independence. Any person who already held citizenship of another country could choose not to accept Irish citizenship.

Under the terms of the Anglo-Irish Treaty, Northern Ireland was included in the Irish Free State on independence, but had the right to opt out of the new state within one month of its establishment. This option was exercised on 7 December 1922. The 24-hour period in which Northern Ireland was officially part of the Irish Free State meant that every person ordinarily resident in Northern Ireland on 6 December who fulfilled the citizenship provisions in the Constitution had automatically become an Irish citizen on that date.

At its inception, the Irish Free State gained independence as a Dominion within the British Empire. Imperial legislation at the time dictated that although individual Dominions could define a citizenship for their own citizens, that citizenship would only be effective within the local Dominion's borders. A Canadian, New Zealand, or Irish citizen who travelled outside their own country would have been regarded as a British subject. This was reinforced by Article 3 of the 1922 Constitution, which stated that Irish citizenship could be exercised "within the limits of the jurisdiction of the Irish Free State". From the British government's perspective, any person born in Ireland remained bound by allegiance to the monarch. The retention of these constitutional ties, rather than a full separation from the Empire, was the central cause of the Irish Civil War.

When Free State authorities were first preparing to issue Irish passports in 1923, the British government insisted on the inclusion of some form of wording that described the holders of these passports as "British subjects". The two sides could not reach agreement on this issue and when the Irish government began issuing passports in 1924, British authorities refused to accept these documents. British consular staff were instructed to confiscate any Irish passports that did not include the term "British subject" and replace them with British passports. This situation continued until 1930, when Irish passports were amended to describe their holders as "one of His Majesty's subjects of the Irish Free State". Despite these disagreements, the two governments agreed not to establish border controls between their jurisdictions, and all Irish citizens and British subjects continued to have the ability to move freely within the Common Travel Area.

==== Delayed citizenship legislation ====
Although the Constitution provided a definition for who acquired citizenship at the time of independence, it contained no detail on how to acquire it after 1922. This created a number of anomalies, including the inability to grant citizenship to foreigners resident in Ireland and foreign spouses of Irish citizens.

By the end of the First World War, the Dominions had exercised increasing autonomy in managing their own affairs and by then each had developed a distinct national identity. Britain formally recognised Dominion autonomy at the 1926 Imperial Conference, jointly issuing the Balfour Declaration with all the Dominion heads of government. The Declaration stated that the United Kingdom and Dominions were autonomous and equal to each other within the British Commonwealth of Nations. Full legislative independence was granted to the Dominions with passage of the Statute of Westminster 1931.

Legislation clarifying Irish citizenship acquisition was delayed due to the government's desire to negotiate an exemption from British subject status with the rest of the Commonwealth. Ultimately no compromise was reached, and Ireland did not pass its own nationality legislation until after passage of the Statute of Westminster 1931. The Irish Nationality and Citizenship Act enacted by the Oireachtas in 1935 provided a full framework detailing requirements for obtaining citizenship. Under the 1935 Act, any individual born in the Irish Free State on or after 6 December 1922, or overseas to an Irish father who himself was born in the state, was a natural-born citizen. Children born abroad to an Irish father who himself was not born within the Free State had to have their birth registered within two years. Northern Ireland was treated as outside of the Free State for the purposes of this Act.

Any person born in Ireland before 6 December 1922 who did not automatically acquire citizenship under the Constitution due to their residence abroad on that date could acquire it, along with their children, by becoming domiciled in the Free State. Irish-born individuals continuing to live overseas became eligible to acquire Irish citizenship by registration, provided that they had not voluntarily naturalised as citizens of another country. Foreign nationals who resided in the Free State for at least five years could apply for naturalisation. Irish citizens older than age 21 who acquired foreign citizenship automatically lost Irish citizenship, and any Irish child who was registered in the Foreign Births Register was required after reaching age 21 to make a declaration of their intention to retain Irish citizenship and state that they had renounced all other nationalities.

==== Conflicting definition for "Irish national" ====
During the period before passage of the 1935 Act, the government enacted several pieces of legislation that restricted certain types of economic activity to "Irish nationals". Under the Control of Manufactures Act 1932, Irish companies were required to be majority-owned by Irish nationals. Because no legislation had yet been enacted defining who was a national, this Act provided a separate definition: an Irish "national" was either born within the borders of the Free State or had been domiciled there for at least five years before 1932. This definition continued to be used even after the 1935 Act was enacted. Significant portions of the Northern Irish population came to be treated as foreigners in commerce as a consequence of these provisions.

This statutory definition differed based on the type of business that a particular Act was regulating. For agriculture and banking, a person born overseas must have been resident in the Free State for at least five years before 1933 to qualify as an Irish national. However, when determining the amount of stamp duty to be levied on property transactions, an Irish national was someone who had lived in the state for three years before 1947. These separate definitions for "Irish national" were repealed after legislative reform in 1956.

==== Common code noncompliance ====
Standard regulations in Commonwealth countries at the time strictly complied with the doctrine of coverture, under which a woman's consent to marry a foreigner was assumed to imply intent to denaturalise. Women's rights groups throughout the Empire pressured the imperial government to amend nationality regulations that tied a married woman's status to that of her husband. Because the British government could no longer enforce legislative supremacy over the Dominions after 1931 and wanted to maintain a strong constitutional link to them through the common nationality code, it was unwilling to make major changes without unanimous agreement among the Dominions on this issue, which it did not have. The 1935 Irish legislation stated that marriage between an Irish citizen and foreign spouse did not affect the national status of either spouse, eroding imperial legal uniformity in this regard. New Zealand and Australia also amended their laws in 1935 and 1936 to allow women denaturalised by marriage to retain their rights as British subjects.

Moreover, the 1935 Act further deviated from the common code by creating an Irish nationality distinct from British nationality and by explicitly repealing all related British-enacted legislation. Despite this separation, British subjects from the United Kingdom and elsewhere in the Commonwealth remained defined as non-foreign in Irish law and those resident in Ireland continued to be treated almost identically to Irish citizens. Irish citizens have not been considered British subjects under Irish law since passage of this Act. Nevertheless, the British government continued to treat virtually all Irish citizens as British subjects, except for those who had acquired Irish citizenship by naturalisation, since the Free State had not incorporated Part II of the British Nationality and Status of Aliens Act 1914 into its legislation. The Irish government rejected adopting this provision because doing so would have implied that Britain could legislate for Ireland, and because public opinion after independence was overwhelmingly negative. Although residents of Northern Ireland were disadvantaged in acquiring citizenship and conducting commerce under Irish law, the territory remained defined as an integral part of the state in the revised 1937 Constitution of Ireland.

=== Changing relationship with Britain and the Commonwealth ===
Diverging developments in Dominion legislation, as well as growing assertions of local national identity separate from that of Britain and the Empire, culminated with the creation of a substantive Canadian citizenship in 1946, breaking the system of a common imperial nationality. That rupture, combined with the approaching independence of India and Pakistan in 1947, made comprehensive reform to British nationality law necessary to address ideas that were incompatible with the previous system.

The British Nationality Act 1948 abolished the common code and each Commonwealth country would enact legislation to create its own nationality. British subject was redefined to mean any citizen of a Commonwealth country, with Commonwealth citizen defined in the Act as a synonym. This combined status co-existed with the citizenships of each Commonwealth country. This change in naming indicated that allegiance to the Crown was no longer required to possess British subject status and that the common status would be maintained by voluntary agreement among the Commonwealth members. Ireland formally declared itself a republic and removed the British monarch's remaining official functions in the Irish state in 1948. Despite India's continued membership as a republic within the Commonwealth following the London Declaration, Ireland ceased to be a member after passage of the Ireland Act 1949 in the British Parliament. Irish citizens have since no longer been defined as British subjects in British law, although they continue to be treated as non-foreign in the United Kingdom and retain the same rights and privileges exercised by Commonwealth citizens; Irish citizens remain eligible to vote and stand for Parliament in the UK.

Commonwealth citizens initially continued to hold free movement rights in both the UK and Ireland after 1949. British authorities systematically discouraged non-white immigration into the UK, but strong economic conditions in Britain following the Second World War attracted an unprecedented wave of colonial migration. In response, the British Parliament imposed immigration controls on any Commonwealth citizens originating from outside the British Islands with the Commonwealth Immigrants Act 1962. Ireland mirrored this restriction and limited free movement only to people born on the islands of Great Britain or Ireland. However, individuals born in the UK since 1983 are British citizens only if at least one parent is already a British citizen. The Irish regulation created a legal anomaly where persons born in Britain without British citizenship nevertheless held an unrestricted right to settle in Ireland; this inconsistency was removed in 1999.

=== Subsequent reforms as a republic ===
The 1956 Irish Nationality and Citizenship Act, which replaced the earlier 1935 Act, expanded the available pathways to citizenship and the circumstances in which it could be retained. Restrictions on holding multiple nationalities were repealed and any Irish citizen who acquired another nationality no longer automatically lost their Irish citizenship. Individuals could instead voluntarily choose to renounce their Irish citizenship. Any person born in Northern Ireland who did not otherwise acquire Irish citizenship by descent could claim citizenship by making a formal declaration. Foreign wives of male Irish citizens could register as citizens with no further requirements and citizenship became transferable by descent through mothers as well as fathers. Although children born overseas to foreign-born Irish citizens were still required to be registered in the Foreign Births Register to claim citizenship, registration was no longer subject to a time limit. Registered individuals were deemed to have been Irish citizens backdated to their date of birth, allowing their children born at any time to acquire citizenship as well.

An amendment in 1986 made foreign husbands of Irish citizens eligible for citizenship by marriage, but introduced a three-year waiting period for applicants of either sex and required couples to be living together in the same residence. Registration in the Foreign Births Register no longer makes citizenship effective from an applicant's date of birth but from the date of registration. The 1986 amendment provided for a six-month transition period ending on 31 December 1986 when registration continued to be backdated, triggering a rush among affected individuals to register before the new rules took effect. The sudden large volume of applications became impossible to process before the end of the year, resulting in some individuals losing their entitlement to citizenship from birth. A further amendment in 1994 allowed those who had applied during the transition period but did not have their applications processed in time to re-register under the 1956 Act. Since 2004, spouses of Irish citizens no longer have a dedicated path to acquiring citizenship, although they do have a shorter residence requirement than others for naturalisation (domiciled for three of the last five years compared to five of the last nine years).

==== European integration ====
As part of their 1973 enlargement, Ireland joined the European Communities (EC), a set of organisations that later developed into the European Union (EU). Irish citizens have since been able to work in other EC/EU countries under the freedom of movement for workers established by the 1957 Treaty of Rome. They participated in their first European Parliament elections in 1979.

With the creation of European Union citizenship by the 1992 Maastricht Treaty, free movement rights were extended to all nationals of EU member states regardless of their employment status. The scope of these rights was further expanded with the establishment of the European Economic Area (EEA) in 1994 to include any national of an EFTA member state other than Switzerland, which concluded a separate free movement agreement with the EU that came into force in 2002. Despite its EEA membership, Liechtenstein exceptionally maintains immigration controls on EEA/Swiss citizens because of its small size and population.

Following the United Kingdom's 2016 referendum in favour of leaving the EU, Irish citizenship applications from Britain (excluding Northern Ireland) increased substantially. While only 54 people from Britain naturalised as Irish citizens in 2015 before the referendum, this number had grown to 1,156 by 2021. Irish citizens (along with Cypriot and Maltese citizens) domiciled in the UK were able to vote in the 2016 referendum while all other non-British EU citizens could not. Despite the UK's withdrawal from the EU on 31 January 2020, Irish citizens continue to have free movement in the UK and Crown Dependencies, unlike other EU nationals.

==== Citizenship by investment ====
In 1988, a citizenship by investment pathway was created ostensibly to attract foreign investment and help lower the high unemployment rate. A foreigner could acquire Irish citizenship through this programme after investing IR£1 million in a business with the goal of creating or maintaining 10 jobs for at least five years. Investors were required to maintain an Irish address or live in the country for at least 60 days before receiving an Irish passport.

Under the 1956 Act, the Minister for Justice, Home Affairs and Migration has absolute discretionary power to waive any citizenship requirements for applicants who are of "Irish association". This term was not defined in legislation, which allowed the minister to use this pathway to grant any foreigner Irish citizenship. The citizenship by investment programme was operated under this authority and was not publicly advertised. The secrecy under which this initiative was operated later became criticised as an attempt to obscure a way for the government to sell passports. About 100 people were able to acquire Irish citizenship through this pathway before its end in 1998. A significant number of applicants who acquired Irish passports in this way never lived in or even entered the country, and their commitments to boosting Irish employment were not fulfilled. A person of Irish association became defined in legislation in 2004 as someone "related by blood, affinity or adoption to a person who is an Irish citizen".

=== Restrictions to birthright citizenship ===
Negotiations for the Northern Ireland peace process resulted in the 1998 Good Friday Agreement. Under these accords, Northern Irish residents were acknowledged as having the right to hold either or both British and Irish citizenships regardless of which country holds sovereignty over Northern Ireland, and any person born on the island of Ireland had a right to hold Irish citizenship. These changes became constitutional entitlements when the Nineteenth Amendment of the Constitution of Ireland was adopted in 1999.

Although Ireland had long granted birthright citizenship to any person born on the island prior to this amendment as a part of statute law, rising immigration to the country led to court rulings narrowing the scope of that entitlement. In the 1990 case Fajujonu v Minister for Justice, the Supreme Court ruled that noncitizen parents of Irish-born children were entitled to remain in Ireland through their children's rights of residence. The application of this ruling was extremely permissive in the years that followed; any non-Irish parent of a child born in Ireland was permitted to remain. The scope of this entitlement was reduced in a 2003 Supreme Court ruling, which determined that the Minister for Justice could examine the circumstances by which a noncitizen parent was claiming a right to remain and could exercise discretionary power to deport any such persons found to be acting contrary to national interest. For Irish-born children with one Irish citizen parent, the noncitizen parent continued to be granted a right to remain without any such qualifications.

However, the scope of noncitizen parental residence rights in the EU was expanded by the 2004 European Court of Justice case Chen v Home Secretary. Man Lavette Chen, a Chinese woman, had travelled to Northern Ireland to give birth to her Irish citizen daughter and then relocated to Wales intending to live permanently in the UK. The court ruled that she had a right of residence in the EU as the primary caregiver of an EU citizen exercising free movement rights in another member state. In response to the perceived "abuse" of citizenship, the Irish government proposed a constitutional amendment limiting birthright citizenship to people with a sufficient existing connection to Ireland. The Irish and British governments issued a joint statement clarifying that the intent of the Good Friday Agreement was not to grant citizenship to persons unconnected to the country and that the proposed changes would not violate the existing agreement on Northern Ireland.

Following a 2004 referendum, the Twenty-seventh Amendment of the Constitution of Ireland was enacted, making the entitlement to birthright citizenship for people without Irish parents dependent on legislation rather than the Constitution. That entitlement was then revoked by the Irish Nationality and Citizenship Act 2004, which introduced parental status requirements for acquiring birthright citizenship. After these changes were implemented, noncitizen parents of Irish children born before 2005 became eligible for a two-year renewable residence grant under the Irish Born Child Scheme. About 17,000 people obtained Irish residency through this programme during its application period in 2005.

== Acquisition and loss of citizenship ==
=== Entitlement by birth, descent, or adoption ===
All persons born in the Republic of Ireland before 1 January 2005 automatically received citizenship at birth regardless of the nationalities of their parents. Individuals born since that date anywhere on the island of Ireland receive Irish citizenship at birth if they are not entitled to any other country's citizenship. Otherwise, they are entitled to but not automatically granted citizenship if at least one parent is an Irish citizen or entitled to be one. The same entitlement extends to children whose parent is a British citizen, has no time limit on their stay in either the Republic or Northern Ireland, or has been domiciled on the island of Ireland for at least three of the preceding four years. Any person entitled to Irish citizenship who performs an act that only an Irish citizen has a right to do, such as applying for an Irish passport or registering to vote in national elections, automatically becomes a citizen.

Individuals born in Northern Ireland from 6 December 1922 to 1 December 1999 who did not have an Irish citizen parent were entitled to become Irish citizens by declaration. Any person born in that territory from 2 December 1999 to 31 December 2004 is entitled to Irish citizenship regardless of the statuses of their parents; this includes children born in Ireland between these dates to foreign government officials with diplomatic immunity. Such children are eligible to claim citizenship by special declaration.

Children born overseas are Irish citizens by descent if either parent or any grandparent was born in Ireland and is either an Irish citizen or entitled to be one, although those born to an Irish parent who was also born overseas are only entitled to Irish citizenship if their birth is registered in the Foreign Births Register or the parent was in public service while resident abroad. Irish citizenship can be continually transmitted through each generation born abroad provided that each birth is registered in the Foreign Births Register before the next generation is born. As of 2017, about 1.47 million Irish citizens lived outside of the Common Travel Area.

Adopted children are automatically granted Irish citizenship if the adoption is completed in Ireland; parents adopting children overseas must register an adoption with Irish authorities for the process to take effect in Irish law and are required to apply for immigration clearance before any adopted children may enter the country as citizens. Abandoned children found in Ireland with unclear parentage are considered to have been born on the island to at least one Irish parent.

=== Naturalisation ===
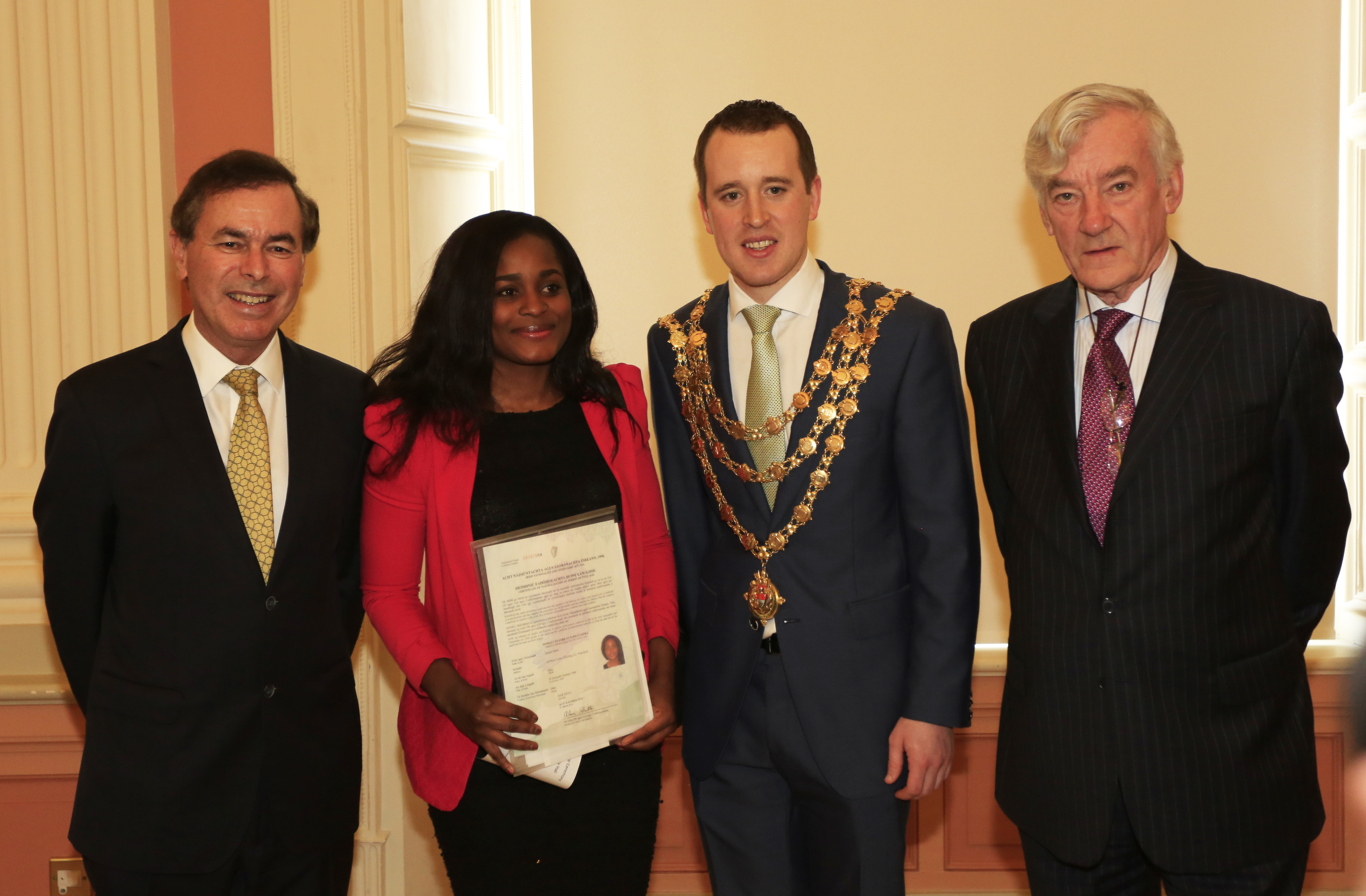
Minister for Justice Alan Shatter, Waterford mayor John Cummins, and former High Court judge Bryan MacMahon with a new citizen at a 2014 citizenship ceremony

Foreigners over the age of 18 as well as minors born in Ireland may naturalise as Irish citizens after residing in the country for at least five of the previous nine years, with one year of continuous residence immediately preceding an application. For applicants married to or in civil partnership with Irish citizens, the residence requirement is reduced to three of the last five years. Candidates must satisfy a good character requirement and intend to remain domiciled in Ireland after naturalising. Individuals under investigation by local police are routinely denied naturalisation. Successful applicants are required to take an oath of citizenship at a public citizenship ceremony. The Minister for Justice has discretionary power to waive any or all citizenship requirements for applicants of Irish descent or association, minor children of naturalised citizens, individuals in public service stationed overseas, or recognised refugees and stateless persons.

=== Loss and resumption ===
Irish citizenship can be relinquished by making a declaration of renunciation, provided that the declarant ordinarily resides overseas and already possesses or is in the process of obtaining another nationality. Renunciations cannot be made during wartime unless specifically approved by the Minister for Justice. Former citizens who were born on the island of Ireland may subsequently apply to reacquire citizenship. Individuals who were previously naturalised or who acquired citizenship by descent do not have a direct path to citizenship restoration and must complete the naturalisation process to regain Irish citizenship.

Citizenship may be involuntarily removed from naturalised persons who fraudulently acquired the status, who wilfully performed an overt act constituting a breach of loyalty to the state, or who hold citizenship of a country at war with the Republic. Naturalised persons, other than those of Irish descent or employed in the civil service, who reside outside the Republic for a continuous period of seven years without annually registering their intention to retain Irish citizenship may be stripped of their citizenship. Individuals who obtained citizenship through their marriage or civil partnership to an Irish citizen before 2005 and who reside outside of the island of Ireland may also have their status removed. This provision for citizenship loss is not enforced in practice.

== Honorary citizenship ==
On advice from the government, the president of Ireland has authority to grant honorary Irish citizenship to any person deemed to have rendered an extraordinary service to the nation. Despite being labelled "honorary", this type of citizenship is a substantive status and gives its holders all the rights and privileges of other Irish citizens. Honorary Irish citizenship has only been awarded to 11 people:

- Alfred Chester Beatty (1957)
- Tiede Herrema and his wife Elizabeth (1975)
- Tip O'Neill and his wife Mildred (1986)
- Alfred Beit and his wife Clementine (1993)
- Jack Charlton and his wife Pat (1996)
- Jean Kennedy Smith (1998)
- Derek Hill (1999)

Taoiseach Seán Lemass intended to award United States president John F. Kennedy honorary citizenship during his state visit to Ireland in 1963, but this was declined due to restrictions in U.S. law that made it difficult for the head of state to accept a foreign honour. Although the Irish government was prepared to enact special legislation to grant a purely honorary title to President Kennedy rather than the substantive status, the U.S. Office of Legal Counsel determined that his acceptance of a personal honour of any kind without the express approval of the United States Congress would have been in violation of the Foreign Emoluments Clause of the United States Constitution.

== See also ==
- Visa policy of Ireland
- Visa requirements for Irish citizens
