= Irish passport card =

Card-form travel document available to citizens of Ireland

Irish Passport Card Cárta Pas Éireannach
- Front of the card

- Reverse
- Type: Travel document Identity document
- Issued by: Department of Foreign Affairs and Trade
- Purpose: Identification
- Valid in: EFTA; European Union; United Kingdom; Rest of Europe (except Belarus, Russia, and Ukraine) Georgia; Montserrat (max. 14 days); Overseas France
- Eligibility: Irish citizens
- Expiration: 5 years or until expiry date of passport booklet (whichever comes first)
- Cost: €35

The Irish Passport Card (Irish: Cárta pas Éireannach) is a wallet-sized travel document issued by the Government of Ireland that allows Irish citizens to travel and prove their identity and citizenship within the European Union, the European Economic Area (EEA), Switzerland, and the United Kingdom. It serves as a more durable and convenient alternative to the standard passport book for travel and proof of identification within these specific regions.

A passport card cannot be issued unless the bearer already has a valid passport booklet. The card is valid for 5 years or until the passport booklet expires, whichever is shorter.

Ireland is the only European Economic Area member state to issue this type of document. All other member states, except Denmark, issue national identity cards that serve the same travel function within the European Economic Area and Switzerland. The Irish passport card is officially not a national identity card under European Union law as it is an ICAO-compliant travel document that does not serve identification purposes within Ireland itself.

Notably, Irish passport cards also allow Irish citizens to travel to and from the United Kingdom and to demonstrate their rights under the Common Travel Area without having to present their passport booklet.

== History ==
A credit card-sized Passport Card was introduced on 5 October 2015. It was originally announced as being available in mid-July 2015 but was subsequently delayed. It conforms to international standards for biometric and machine readable travel documents promulgated by ICAO.

Unlike the United States Passport Card, which cannot be used for international air travel or for land and sea travel outside North America, the Irish passport card can be used for air travel and throughout the European Economic Area and Switzerland and some non-EEA countries such as Albania, Bosnia and Herzegovina, Georgia, Kosovo, Moldova, Montenegro, Montserrat (max. 14 days in transit to a third country), North Macedonia, Serbia, and the United Kingdom. However, at introduction, it was only publicised as having been approved for entry and exit by countries in the EEA. A few days afterwards it was confirmed that Switzerland had given its approval.

The Irish Passport Card is a passport in card format and is intended to be usable as a travel document in most European countries, in a similar way to national identity cards elsewhere in the EEA or the Russian internal passport with respect to travel to some countries and autonomous territories within the former USSR. It is largely treated in the same way as an identity card in several other EU countries, since that is what their laws call such cards. However, the IATA Timatic database used by airlines to find out document requirements lists the passport card as a separate document type. The card uses the designation "IP" in its machine readable zone (MRZ) (the "I" means identity card and the "P" is undefined in the MRZ standard). Although ICAO began preparatory work on machine readable passport cards as early as 1968, Ireland was the first country to issue one for air travel and the Irish Minister for Foreign Affairs and Trade, Charles Flanagan, highlighted the novelty and utility of Ireland's Passport Card at its 2015 introduction.

The card costs €35, with a €10 discount if applied for at the same time as a passport book, and is valid for five years or the validity of the bearer's passport booklet, whichever is less. From November 2018, Passport Cards are available to Irish citizens of all ages.

Unlike national identity cards issued in other parts of the EU, an Irish passport card cannot be issued unless the bearer already has a valid passport booklet but, because of its convenient size and durable format compared to the Irish passport booklet, it will also serve purposes similar to that of national identity cards in other parts of the EU: identity and age verification, and intra-EU travel.

Although they can be used at electronic passport control gates at Dublin Airport, it was not possible, in 2018, to use this card at many electronic border gates/e-gates in continental Europe.

EU Regulation 2025/1208, which requires EEA national identity cards issued since 2 August 2021 to contain fingerprints and follow a common format, does not apply to ICAO-compliant travel documents such the passport card issued by Ireland, as confirmed by Recital 12 in the preamble. However, the passport card directly follows ICAO Document 9303, which gives other biometric requirements on which EU Regulation 2025/1208 is based.

== Security features ==
Irish passport cards have security features designed to make them difficult to forge or be mistaken as forgeries. They have also been optimised for machine reading. The top-left corner of the passport card contains the biometric chip, which contains a copy of the information printed on the card, and a facial scan of the holder. To prevent unauthorised parties remotely accessing the information stored in the RFID biometric chip, the machine readable zone of the identity page must be scanned to unlock it. This safeguard is known as Basic Access Control.

The designation of the document "Éire/Ireland/Irlande" "Pas/Passport/Passeport" is printed in colour-changing ink, which varies from light green to gold-red, depending on the angle of the light shining on it. The background for the front of the passport card is a complex Celtic design, with the words for Ireland appearing in the official languages of the EU as part of the design.

The identity picture is greyscale, and is digitally printed onto the surface of the special security polycarbonate. The Irish harp is superimposed as a hologram onto the bottom right corner of the photograph. A likeness of the applicant in a hologram photo on a strip on the back:. According to Charles Flanagan, the then Foreign Affairs minister, this is the first time such a security feature was going to be used on travel documents. The Passport Card was updated in October 2021 to change the strip at the rear of the card from a silver reflective (OSM) strip to a SealCrypt strip.

Ireland's passport card was joint winner of the 'Best Regional ID Document' at the High Security Printing Europe Conference in Bucharest, Romania in March 2016.

== See also ==
- National identity cards in the European Economic Area
- Irish passport
- Identity document
