= Croatian passport =

Travel document

Croatian passport; Hrvatska putovnica
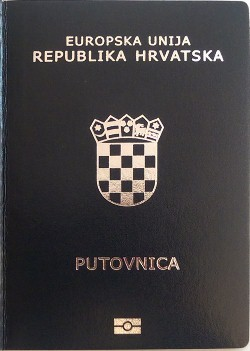
- The front cover of a contemporary Croatian biometric passport.

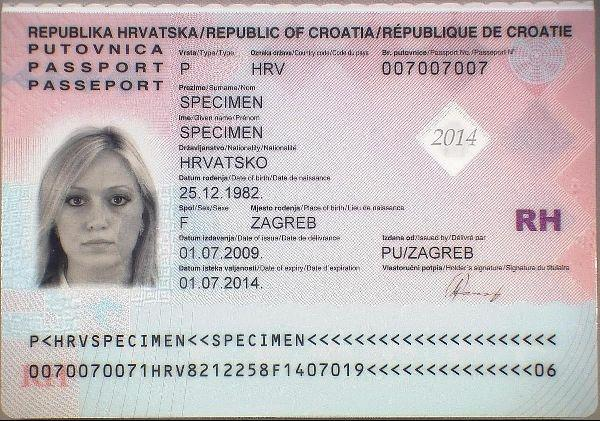
- The data page of a contemporary Croatian biometric passport
- Type: Passport
- Issued by: Croatia
- First issued: 26 June 1991 (first version); 29 June 2009 (biometric passport); 3 August 2015 (current version; first EU version)
- Purpose: Identification
- Eligibility: Croatian citizenship
- Expiration: 10 or 5 years after acquisition
- Cost: €42,47 – without delivery; €46,45 – with delivery to the residence

Croatian passport (Croatian: Hrvatska putovnica) is issued to citizens of the Republic of Croatia for the purpose of international travel. The passport has the purpose of serving as proof of Croatian citizenship and identity. Responsibility for their issuance lies with the Ministry of the Interior; and for citizens abroad, passports are issued by the local embassy or consulate. Croatian passports are valid for ten or five years, and are not renewable. Every Croatian citizen is also a citizen of the European Union. The passport, along with the national identity card allows for free rights of movement and residence in any of the states of the European Economic Area and Switzerland.

Croatia started issuing biometric passports on 1 July 2009.

== Physical appearance ==
Croatian passports are dark blue, with the Croatian coat of arms emblazoned in the centre of the front cover. The words Europska Unija and Republika Hrvatska are inscribed above the coat of arms, with the word Putovnica and the international biometric passport symbol below. The passport contains 34 pages.

The third generation Croatian passport has been changed in design due to the accession into the European Union. From 3 August 2015, the new Croatian passport retained its dark blue cover and is the odd one out among the 27 European Union member states' passports and the words Europska unija (European Union in Croatian) have been printed on it as per EU regulations. Additionally, the new cover is only in Croatian; the English and French have been removed.

=== Languages ===
The data page/information page is printed in Croatian, English and French.

=== Data pages ===
From 2009, each biometric passport has a data page and a residence page. A data page has a visual zone and a machine-readable zone. The visual zone has a digitised photograph of the passport holder, data about the passport, and data about the passport holder:

Page No.2:

- Photograph
- Type of document, which is "P" for "passport"
- Code of the issuing country, which is "HRV" for "Croatia"
- Passport number
- Surname
- Given names
- Nationality, which is "Hrvatsko" ("Croatian")
- Date of birth
- Sex
- Place of birth
- Date of issue
- Date of expiration
- Issuing authority
- Signature

Page No.3:

- Personal identification number

== History ==
Croatian Passports were first issued by the Kingdom of Croatia-Slavonia-Dalmatia under Austria-Hungary. They were written in Croatian and French and had the coat of arms of the Kingdom of Croatia-Slavonia-Dalmatia on the cover.

Biometric Croatian passports

The first modern Croatian passports were issued from 26 June 1991, after Croatia declared its independence from Yugoslavia. The old Yugoslav passports were valid until 25 June 1992. Since then, three types of Croatian passports have been issued, all machine-readable and with blue covers.

The first series was issued from 1991, until the end of 1999. It was distinguished by a thick paper cover and a laminated photo inside the document. This passport was printed by the local police station in the town of residence, or by the local embassy or consulate for citizens residing abroad. This series was in circulation until 31 December 2009, when the last ten-year passport issued expired.

At the end of 1999, the Croatian Government introduced the new passport. New security features similar to those on banknotes have been added with increasing frequency since January 2000. Microprinting, holographic images, UV-visible imaging, watermarks and other details have been implemented, particularly on the photo page. As well, the photo is now digitally printed directly on the paper (in both standard and UV-reactive ink). The new passports were issued in the same way as the old ones, with a difference in printing process. All passports are printed in Zagreb, with the issuing wait time up to 30 days. They have been issued since 1 January 2000.

== Biometric passport ==
From 30 June 2009, the government started issuing new biometric passports in Zagreb. Other local police stations started issuing biometric passports on 18 January 2010. The embassies or consulates issued biometric passports from 30 June 2010. Non-biometric passports remained valid until the stated date of expiry.

Croatia was the third country in Europe that started issuing second-generation biometric passports. The chip contains two fingerprints and a digital image of the passport holder.

== Types of passports ==
- Regular Passport – Blue colour, valid for five (if under the age of 21) or ten years (if over the age of 21).
- Diplomatic and Official Passport – For Croatian diplomats, their spouses and children. It is valid for five years.
- Traveling Certificate, Laissez Passer or Putni List – Travel certificate is a travel document issued by the Croatian diplomatic mission or consular office to Croatian citizen who resides or is found abroad without travel documents to return to Croatia. The same travel certificate may be used by the spouse and children's, the travel certificate is valid for 30 days.

== Visa-free travel ==
Visa requirements for Croatian citizens Croatia Freedom of movement Visa not required Visa on arrival eVisa Visa available both on arrival or online Visa required prior to arrival

Visa requirements for Croatian citizens are administrative entry restrictions by the authorities of other states placed on citizens of Croatia. As of 2025, Croatian citizens have visa-free or visa-on-arrival access to 185 countries and territories, ranking the Croatian passport 7th in the world according to the Henley Passport Index, as well as ranking 5th (including visa-free travel to China from November 2024) according to The Passport Index (Arton).

== International travel using ID card ==
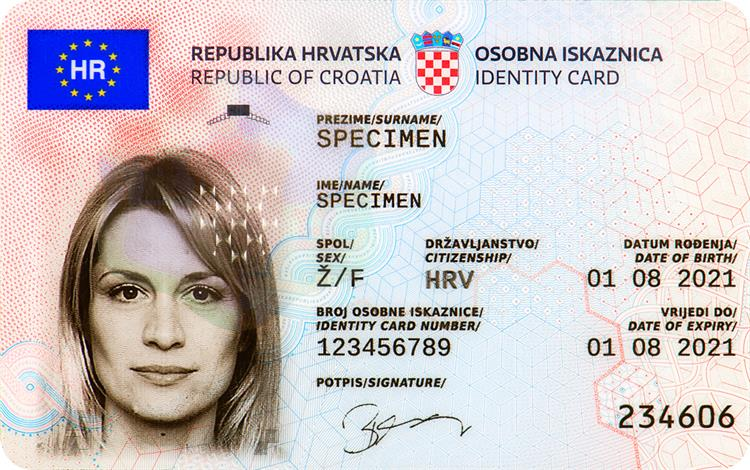
Current version of the Croatian ID card

Croatia finished negotiating their accession to the European Economic Area in November 2013. Since then, the Croatian identity card has been a valid travel document within all of Europe (except Belarus, Russia, Ukraine and United Kingdom) as well as French overseas territories, Georgia and Tunisia.

Validity in these countries (except Albania, Bosnia and Herzegovina, Georgia, North Macedonia, Moldova, Montenegro, North Cyprus and Serbia) is based on the membership of the European Union and the implementation of the "European Agreement on Regulations governing the Movement of Persons between Member States of the Council of Europe".

=== Gallery of historic passports ===
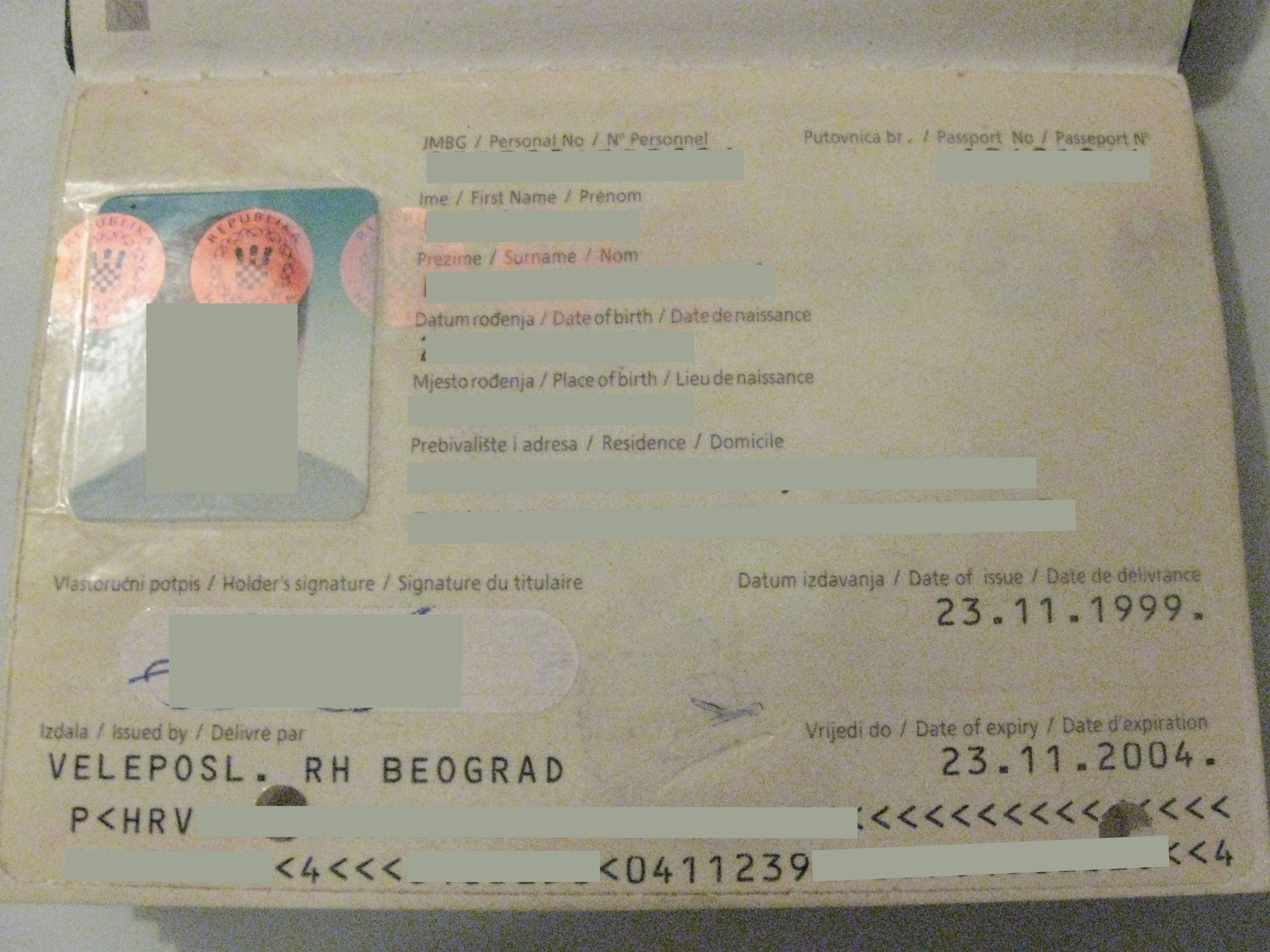
Passport issued from 1991 to 1999

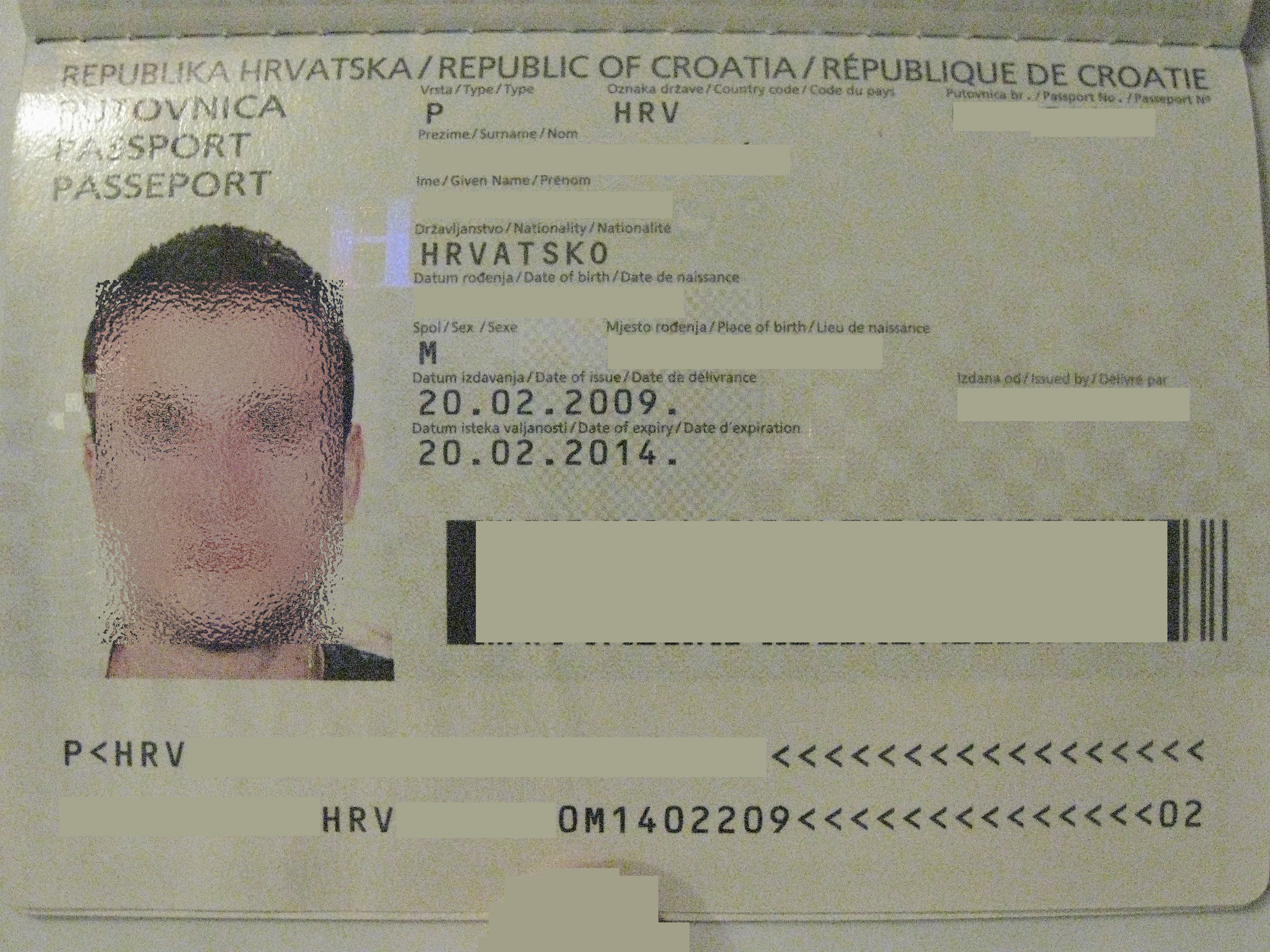
Passport issued from 2000 to 2010, non-biometric

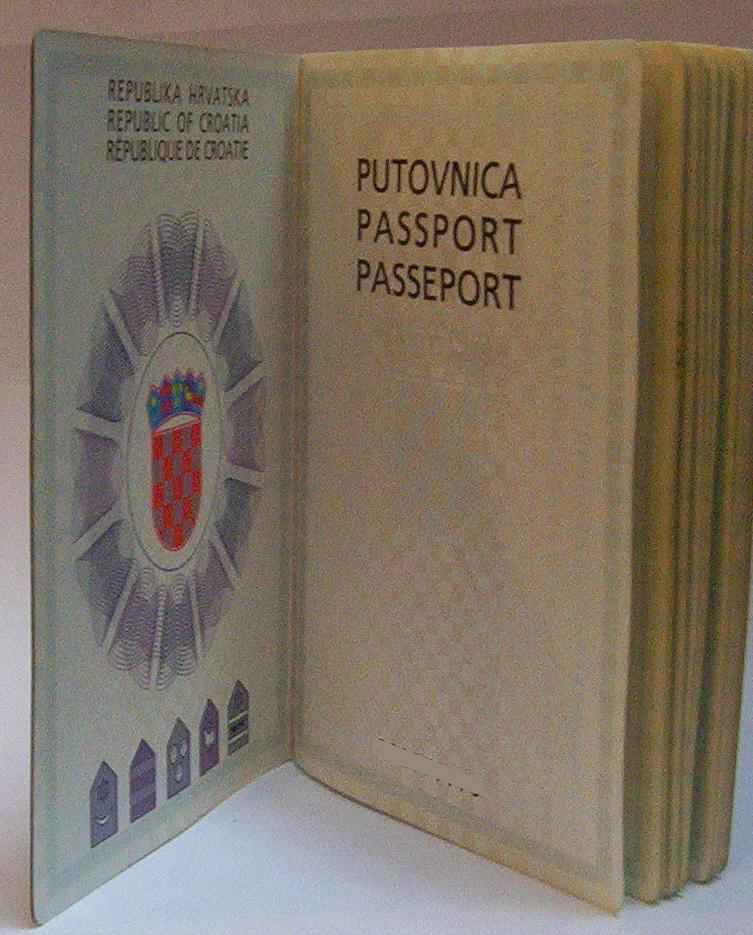
Croatian passport, non-biometric, first page

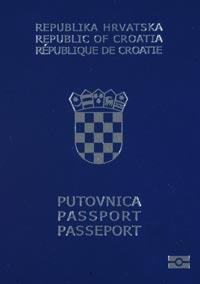
Biometric passport cover (2nd generation), issued 2009—2015

== See also ==
- Passports of the European Union
- List of passports
- Visa requirements for Croatian citizens
- Visa policy of the Schengen Area
- Foreign relations of Croatia
- List of diplomatic missions of Croatia
