= Visa requirements for Montenegrin citizens =

Administrative entry restrictions

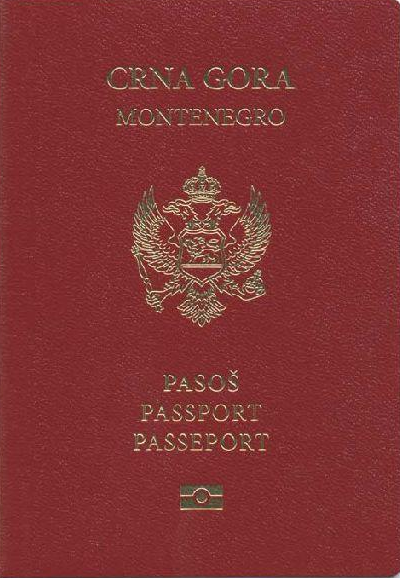
A Montenegrin passport

Visa requirements for Montenegrin citizens are administrative entry restrictions imposed by the authorities of foreign states on citizens of Montenegro.

As of 2026, Montenegrin citizens had visa-free or visa on arrival access to 126 countries and territories, ranking the Montenegrin passport 37th in the world, according to the Henley Passport Index.

== Visa requirements map ==
Visa requirements for Montenegrin citizens holding ordinary passports Montenegro ID card travel Visa not required Visa on arrival eVisa Visa available both on arrival or online Visa required

== Visa requirements ==
Country	Visa requirement	Allowed stay	Notes (excluding departure fees)	Reciprocity
Afghanistan	eVisa	30 days	Visa is not required for those born in Afghanistan, or those who can prove that one of their parents is a national of Afghanistan or was born in Afghanistan.; e-Visa : Visitors must arrive at Kabul International (KBL).	✓
Albania	Visa not required	90 days	ID card valid.	✓
Algeria	eVisa		Algerian eVisa offered exclusively on Africa Tour Visa website, and is in the process of being launched officially by the Algerian government. The process of obtaining the eVisa from Africa Tour Visa website is covered by the Algerian visa services provided by the Government of Algeria.; Fee is $120.00 and is paid upon arrival.	✓
Andorra	Visa not required			✓
Angola	Visa required			✓
Antigua and Barbuda	eVisa			X
Argentina	Visa not required	90 days		✓
Armenia	Visa not required	180 days		X
Australia	Online visa required		May apply online (Online Visitor e600 visa).	X
Austria	Visa not required	90 days	90 days within any 180-day period in the Schengen Area. (Note: Holders of biometric passports only.)	✓
Azerbaijan	Visa not required	90 days		X
Bahamas	eVisa			X
Bahrain	eVisa / Visa on arrival	14 days		X
Bangladesh	Visa on arrival	30 days	Not available at all entry points.	X
Barbados	Visa not required	90 days		✓
Belarus	Visa required			✓
Belgium	Visa not required	90 days	90 days within any 180-day period in the Schengen Area.	✓
Belize	Visa required			✓
Benin	eVisa	30 days	Must have an international vaccination certificate.	X
Bhutan	eVisa			✓
Bolivia	Online Visa / Visa on arrival	90 days		X
Bosnia and Herzegovina	Visa not required	90 days	90 days within any 6-month period.; ID card valid.	✓
Botswana	eVisa	3 months		X
Brazil	Visa not required	90 days	90 days within any 180-day period.	✓
Brunei	Visa required			X
Bulgaria	Visa not required	90 days	90 days within any 180-day period in the Schengen Area.	✓
Burkina Faso	eVisa			X
Burundi	Visa on arrival	1 month		X
Cambodia	eVisa / Visa on arrival	30 days		X
Cameroon	eVisa			X
Canada	Visa required			X
Cape Verde	Visa on arrival		Not available at all entry points.	X
Central African Republic	Visa required			✓
Chad	eVisa			✓
Chile	Visa not required	90 days		✓
China	Visa not required	30 days	Visa-free from 30 November, 2024 to 31 December, 2026.; 240-hour (10-day) visa-free transit to a third country or region (including Hong Kong, Macau or Taiwan) using any mode of transport. Must have a confirmed onward ticket/itinerary, and enter through 1 of 64 approved ports.; During which, may freely travel within the 24 provinces permitted for visa-free transit and engage in tourism, business, and visits.; 24-hour visa-free transit to a third country or region (including Hong Kong, Macau, and Taiwan), is available at most international airports, without leaving the airport.; Travellers who need to leave the airport may obtain a temporary entry permit from immigration.; 5-day port visa (Visa on Arrival) for Shenzhen if arriving at designated ports of entry from Hong Kong by land or sea, for stays within Shenzhen.; 3-day port visa (Visa on Arrival) if arriving in Zhuhai or Xiamen at designated ports of entry, for stays within the respective city.; 15-day visa-free entry for cruise ship passengers in tour groups, if arriving at any cruise port along China's coastline, including but not limited to Tianjin; Dalian; Shanghai; Lianyungang; Wenzhou; Zhoushan; Xiamen; Qingdao; Guangzhou; Shenzhen; Beihai; Haikou; Sanya. May further travel inland to all regions of coastal provinces (and equivalents) and Beijing.; May apply for a port visa (Visa on Arrival) if travelling for an urgent, qualified reason. Prior clearance for port visa is highly recommended or may be denied boarding by airlines.	X
Colombia	Visa not required	90 days	Might be extended up to 180 days	✓
Comoros	Visa on arrival	45 days		X
Republic of the Congo	eVisa			✓
Democratic Republic of the Congo	eVisa	7 days		X
Costa Rica	Visa not required	90 days		✓
Côte d'Ivoire	eVisa	3 months	e-Visa holders must arrive via Port Bouet Airport.	X
Croatia	Visa not required	90 days	90 days within any 180-day period.	✓
Cuba	Visa not required	90 days		x
Cyprus	Visa not required	90 days	90 days within any 180-day period.	✓
Czech Republic	Visa not required	90 days	90 days within any 180-day period in the Schengen Area.	✓
Denmark	Visa not required	90 days	90 days within any 180-day period in the Schengen Area. (DK)	✓
Djibouti	eVisa	90 days		X
Dominica	Visa not required	21 days		✓
Dominican Republic	Visa not required	90 days		✓
Ecuador	Visa not required	90 days		X
Egypt	eVisa / Visa on arrival	30 days		X
El Salvador	Visa required		90 days visa free if hold a valid visa issued by Canada, the United States or a Schengen member state	X
Equatorial Guinea	eVisa			X
Eritrea	Visa required			✓
Estonia	Visa not required	90 days	90 days within any 180-day period in the Schengen Area.	✓
Eswatini	Visa not required	30 days		X
Ethiopia	eVisa / Visa on arrival	up to 90 days	e-Visa holders must arrive via Addis Ababa Bole International Airport.	X
Fiji	eVisa		might be accessed online at	✓
Finland	Visa not required	90 days	90 days within any 180-day period in the Schengen Area.	✓
France	Visa not required	90 days	90 days within any 180-day period in the Schengen Area.	✓
Gabon	eVisa	90 days	e-Visa holders must arrive via Libreville International Airport.	X
Gambia	Visa required			✓
Georgia	Visa not required	1 year		✓
Germany	Visa not required	90 days	90 days within any 180-day period in the Schengen Area.	✓
Ghana	Visa required			✓
Greece	Visa not required	90 days	90 days within any 180-day period in the Schengen Area.	✓
Grenada	Visa on arrival	3 months		X
Guatemala	Visa required		90 days visa free if hold a valid visa issued by Canada, the United States or a Schengen member state	X
Guinea	eVisa	90 days		X
Guinea-Bissau	eVisa / Visa on arrival	90 days		X
Guyana	Visa required			✓
Haiti	Visa not required	90 days		X
Honduras	Visa required		90 days visa free if hold a valid visa issued by Canada, the United States or a Schengen member state	X
Hungary	Visa not required	90 days	90 days within any 180-day period in the Schengen Area.	✓
Iceland	Visa not required	90 days	90 days within any 180-day period in the Schengen Area.	✓
India	eVisa	30 days	e-Visa holders must arrive via 32 designated airports (Note: Ahmedabad; Amritsar; Bagdogra; Bengaluru; Bhubaneswar; Chandigarh; Chennai; Coimbatore; Delhi; Gaya; Goa-Dabolim; Goa-Manohar; Guwahati; Hyderabad; Indore; Jaipur; Kannur; Kochi; Kolkata; Kozhikode; Lucknow; Madurai; Mangaluru; Mumbai; Nagpur; Port Blair; Pune; Surat; Thiruvananthapuram; Tiruchirappalli; Varanasi; Visakhapatnam) or 5 designated seaports. (Note: Chennai; Cochin; Mormugao (Goa); Mumbai; Mangalore); An Indian e-Tourist Visa may only be obtained twice within 1 calendar year.; Foreigners of Pakistani origin or who hold a Pakistani Passport are not eligible for an e-Visa. Foreigners who are not Pakistani nationals, but whose parents or grandparents (either paternal or maternal) were born in, or were permanent residents in Pakistan, are also not eligible for an e-Visa.	X
Indonesia	Visa required			✓
Iran	eVisa	30 days		X
Iraq	eVisa			X
Ireland	Visa required		Visa is issued free of charge.; Visa waiver for UK 'C' visa holders. Entry permitted only if first point of entry to the Common Travel Area is in the UK.	X
Israel	Electronic Travel Authorization	3 months		✓
Italy	Visa not required	90 days	90 days within any 180-day period in the Schengen Area.	✓
Jamaica	Visa required		30 days visa free if holding a valid visa issued by any member state of Schengen Area, Canada, the United Kingdom or the United States and who have a proof that they are immunized against measles, rubella and polio.	X
Japan	Visa not required	90 days	As of September 1, 2025 Visa requirements for a short-term stay are / to be waived for Montenegrin citizens who have ICAO-compliant IC passports (ePassports)	✓
Jordan	eVisa / Visa on arrival	30 days		X
Kazakhstan	eVisa			x
Kenya	Electronic Travel Authorisation	90 days	Applications can be submitted up to 90 days prior to travel and must be submitted at least 3 days in advance.; eTA fee is 32.50 USD.; Proof of reservation at the hotel where visitors plan to stay is required (if staying with friends, an invitation letter is also acceptable).; Yellow fever vaccination certificate is required if coming from endemic countries.	X
Kiribati	Visa required			✓
North Korea	Visa required			✓
South Korea	Electronical Travel Authorization	30 days	The validity period of a K-ETA is 3 years from the date of approval.	✓
Kuwait	Visa required			x
Kyrgyzstan	Visa not required	60 days		X
Laos	eVisa / Visa on arrival	30 days	18 (Note: Savannakhet Airport; Lanetoui - Mengkang (China); Meuangmom - Wan Pong (Myanmar); Banvang - Ban Khok Phai (Thailand); Namngeun - Huay Kon (Thailand); Paksan - Bueng Kan (Thailand); Paktaphan - Pak Saeng (Thailand); Pangmon - Ban Huak (Thailand); Phoudou (Thailand); Dak ta ock - Nam Giang (Vietnam); La Lai (Vietnam); Namkan (Vietnam); Namphao - Cau Treo (Vietnam); Namsoy - Na Meo (Vietnam); Naphao - Cha Lo (Vietnam); Pahang - Long Sap (Vietnam); Panghok - Tây Trang (Vietnam); Phoukeua - Bo Y (Vietnam)) of the 33 border crossings are only open to regular visa holders.; e-Visa may be used to enter Laos through the Luang Prabang, Pakse and Vientiane international airports, 3 Thai-Lao Friendship Bridges (Note: Vientiane (Friendship Bridge 1); Savannakhet (Friendship Bridge 2); Bokeo (Friendship Bridge 4)), in Boten (road and railroad), and in Vientiane (at Khamsavath railway station).; Visa on arrival is available at the Luang Prabang, Pakse and Vientiane international airports, 4 Thai-Lao Friendship Bridges (Note: Vientiane (Friendship Bridge 1); Savannakhet (Friendship Bridge 2); Khammouane (Friendship Bridge 3); Bokeo (Friendship Bridge 4)) and 7 border crossings. (Note: Nongnokkheane - Trapeang Kriel (Cambodia); Boten - Bo han (China); Golden Triangle/Samliemkham (Thailand); Khamsavath railway station (Thailand); Namheuang - Ban Na Kraseng (Thailand); Vang tao - Chongmek (Thailand); Dansavan - Lao Bảo (Vietnam))	X
Latvia	Visa not required	90 days	90 days within any 180-day period in the Schengen Area.	✓
Lebanon	Free visa on arrival	1 month	Extendable for 2 additional months; Granted free of charge at Beirut International Airport or any other port of entry if there is no Israeli visa or seal, holding a telephone number, an address in Lebanon, and a non-refundable return or circle trip ticket.	X
Lesotho	eVisa	44 days		X
Liberia	eVisa			✓
Libya	eVisa			✓
Liechtenstein	Visa not required	90 days	90 days within any 180-day period in the Schengen Area.	✓
Lithuania	Visa not required	90 days	90 days within any 180-day period in the Schengen Area.	✓
Luxembourg	Visa not required	90 days	90 days within any 180-day period in the Schengen Area.	✓
Madagascar	eVisa / Visa on arrival	60 days		X
Malawi	eVisa / Visa on arrival	90 days		X
Malaysia	eVisa	30 days		X
Maldives	Free visa on arrival	30 days		X
Mali	Visa required			✓
Malta	Visa not required	90 days	90 days within any 180-day period in the Schengen Area.	✓
Marshall Islands	Visa required			✓
Mauritania	eVisa		Available at Nouakchott–Oumtounsy International Airport.	X
Mauritius	Visa on arrival	180 days		x
Mexico	Visa required		180 days visa free if hold a valid visa or permanent residence issued by Canada, Japan, Schengen Area, the United Kingdom and the United States as well as only permanent residence issued by Colombia and Chile	X
Micronesia	Visa not required	30 days		X
Moldova	Visa not required	90 days	90 days within any 180-day period.	✓
Monaco	Visa not required			✓
Mongolia	eVisa	30 days		X
Morocco	Visa required		May apply for an e-Visa if holding a valid visa or a residency document issued by one of the following countries: Schengen Area, Australia, Canada, Ireland, New Zealand, United Kingdom, United States a residency document issued by Cyprus, Japan, United Arab Emirates.	✓
Mozambique	eVisa / Visa on arrival	30 days		X
Myanmar	Visa required			✓
Namibia	Visa required			✓
Nauru	Visa required			✓
Nepal	Online Visa / Visa on arrival	90 days		X
Netherlands	Visa not required	90 days	90 days within any 180-day period in the Schengen Area. (European Netherlands)	✓
New Zealand	Visa required		Collective passports issued by the former Federal Republic of Yugoslavia are unacceptable, and visas will not be endorsed in them.; Holders of an Australian Permanent Resident Visa or Resident Return Visa may be granted a New Zealand Resident Visa on arrival permitting indefinite stay (pursuant to the Trans-Tasman Travel Arrangement), subject to meeting character requirements and obtaining an Electronic Travel Authority prior to departure.	X
Nicaragua	Visa on arrival	90 days		X
Niger	Visa required			✓
Nigeria	eVisa	90 days		X
North Macedonia	Visa not required	90 days	ID card valid.	✓
Norway	Visa not required	90 days	90 days within any 180-day period in the Schengen Area.	✓
Oman	Visa required			✓
Pakistan	eVisa	90 days		X
Palau	Free visa on arrival	30 days		X
Panama	Visa not required	90 days		✓
Papua New Guinea	eVisa	60 days	Visitors may apply for a visa online under the "Tourist - Own Itinerary" category.	X
Paraguay	Visa required			X
Peru	Visa not required	90 days		✓
Philippines	Visa required		Residents of the United Arab Emirates may obtain an eVisa through the official Philippine eVisa website. A valid Emirati residence visa must be shown upon an eVisa application.	✓
Poland	Visa not required	90 days	90 days within any 180-day period in the Schengen Area.	✓
Portugal	Visa not required	90 days	90 days within any 180-day period in the Schengen Area.	✓
Qatar	eVisa / Visa on arrival	30 days		X
Romania	Visa not required	90 days	90 days within any 180-day period in the Schengen Area.	✓
Russia	Visa not required	30 days	For a maximum total stay of 90 days within one calendar year period; Visa not required until 30 December 2026	X
Rwanda	eVisa / Visa on arrival	30 days		X
Saint Kitts and Nevis	Electronic Travel Authorisation			✓
Saint Lucia	Visa not required	6 weeks		✓
Saint Vincent and the Grenadines	Visa not required	3 months		✓
Samoa	Visa not required	60 days		✓
San Marino	Visa not required			✓
São Tomé and Príncipe	eVisa			x
Saudi Arabia	eVisa / Visa on arrival	90 days		X
Senegal	Visa required			✓
Serbia	Visa not required	90 days	90 days within any 6-month period.; ID card valid.	✓
Seychelles	Electronic Border System	3 months	Application can be submitted up to 30 days before travel.; Visitors must upload a reservation confirmation(s) for each visitor's location of stay in Seychelles.; Yellow fever vaccination certificate is required if coming from endemic countries.; Payment of the fee (EUR 10) by credit or debit card.; Valid for one journey only and it expires once exit the country.	✓
Sierra Leone	eVisa	3 months		X
Singapore	Visa not required	30 days		✓
Slovakia	Visa not required	90 days	90 days within any 180-day period in the Schengen Area.	✓
Slovenia	Visa not required	90 days	90 days within any 180-day period in the Schengen Area.	✓
Solomon Islands	eVisa			✓
Somalia	eVisa	30 days	All visitors must have an approved Electronic Visa (eTAS) before the start of their journey.	x
South Africa	Visa required			✓
South Sudan	eVisa		Obtainable online.; Printed visa authorization must be presented at the time of travel.	X
Spain	Visa not required	90 days	90 days within any 180-day period in the Schengen Area.	✓
Sri Lanka	eVisa / Visa on arrival	60 days / 30 days	Sri Lanka introduced an ETA valid for 30 days.	X
Sudan	eVisa			✓
Suriname	Visa not required	90 days	An entrance fee of USD 50 or EUR 50 must be paid online prior to arrival.; Multiple entry e-Visa is also available.	X
Sweden	Visa not required	90 days	90 days within any 180-day period in the Schengen Area.	✓
Switzerland	Visa not required	90 days	90 days within any 180-day period in the Schengen Area.	✓
Syria	eVisa			X
Tajikistan	Visa not required	30 days	60 days eVisa also available .	X
Tanzania	eVisa / Visa on arrival	90 days		X
Thailand	eVisa	60 days		X
Timor-Leste	Visa on arrival	30 days	Not available at all points of entry.; Obtainable at the Presidente Nicolau Lobato International Airport or at the Dili Sea Port.	X
Togo	eVisa	15 days		X
Tonga	Visa required			✓
Trinidad and Tobago	Visa not required	30 days		✓
Tunisia	Visa not required	3 months		X
Turkey	Visa not required	3 months		X
Turkmenistan	eVisa			✓
Tuvalu	Visa on arrival	1 month		X
Uganda	eVisa	3 months	Determined at the port of entry.	X
Ukraine	Visa not required	90 days	90 days within any 180-day period.	✓
United Arab Emirates	Visa not required	90 days		✓
United Kingdom	Visa required			X
United States	Visa required			X
Uruguay	Visa not required	90 days		✓
Uzbekistan	Visa not required	30 days		X
Vanuatu	eVisa			x
Vatican City	Visa not required			✓
Venezuela	eVisa		Introduction of Electronic Visa System for Tourist and Business Travelers.	X
Vietnam	eVisa	90 days	Phú Quốc without a visa for up to 30 days.	X
Yemen	Visa required			✓
Zambia	Visa not required	90 days		X
Zimbabwe	eVisa	3 months		X

== Unrecognized or partially recognized countries ==
Countries	Conditions of access	Notes
Abkhazia	Visa required	
Kosovo	Visa not required	90 days, ID card valid
Northern Cyprus	Visa not required	90 days
Palestine	Visa not required	Access to Gaza Strip severely restricted.
Sahrawi Arab Democratic Republic		Undefined visa regime in the Sahrawi Arab Democratic Republic
South Ossetia	Visa not required	Must notify about arrival in advance.
Taiwan	eVisa	30 days
Transnistria	Visa not required	45 days

== Dependent and autonomous territories ==
Countries	Conditions of access	Notes
United Kingdom
Anguilla	eVisa required	Holders of a valid visa or residence permit for the United Kingdom, United States or Canada do not need a visa
Bermuda	Visa required	
British Virgin Islands	Visa required	Holders of a visa for the United Kingdom, United States or Canada do not need a visa. The visa for those countries must have at least 6 months of validity before travel
Cayman Islands	Visa required	
Falkland Islands	Visa required	
Gibraltar	Visa required	
Guernsey	Visa required	
Isle of Man	Visa required	
Jersey	Visa required	
Montserrat	eVisa	Holders of a valid visa for the United Kingdom, United States, Canada or an EU country do not need a visa.
Turks and Caicos Islands	Visa required	Holders of a valid visa or residence permit for the United Kingdom, United States or Canada do not need a visa
Saint Helena	eVisa	
China
Hong Kong	Visa not required	14 days
Macau	Visa not required	90 days
Denmark
Faroe Islands	Visa not required	90 days
Greenland	Visa not required	90 days
Netherlands
Aruba	Visa not required	90 days
Caribbean Netherlands	Visa not required	90 days; includes Bonaire, Sint Eustatius and Saba
Curaçao	Visa not required	90 days
Sint Maarten	Visa not required	90 days
France
French Guiana	Visa not required	90 days
French Polynesia	Visa not required	90 days
(France) French West Indies	Visa not required	90 days; includes overseas departments of Guadeloupe and Martinique and overseas collectivities of Saint Martin and Saint Barthélemy
Mayotte	Visa not required	90 days
New Caledonia	Visa not required	90 days
Réunion	Visa not required	90 days
Saint Pierre and Miquelon	Visa not required	90 days
Wallis and Futuna	Visa not required	90 days
New Zealand
Cook Islands	Visa not required	31 days
Niue	Visa not required	30 days
Tokelau	Entry permit required	
South Korea
Jeju Special Autonomous Province	Visa not required	30 days
United States
American Samoa	Visa required	
Guam	Visa required	
Northern Mariana Islands	Visa required	
U.S. Virgin Islands	Visa required	
Puerto Rico	Visa required	

== See also ==
- Visa policy of Montenegro
- Montenegrin passport
- Montenegrin identity card
- List of passports
- Foreign relations of Montenegro
