= Montenegrin passport =

Passport of Montenegro

- Front cover of a Montenegrin passport

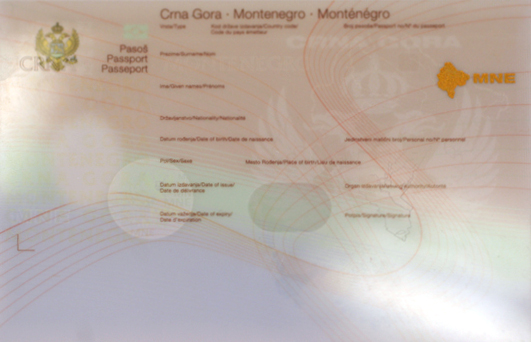
- Integrated biodata card of a Montenegrin passport
- Type: Passport
- Issued by: Montenegro
- First issued: 5 May 2008 (current version)
- Purpose: Identification
- Eligibility: Montenegrin citizenship
- Cost: €33

The Montenegrin passport (Montenegrin: Pasoš Crne Gore, Montenegrin Cyrillic / Montenegrin: Пасош Црне Горе, Albanian: Pasaporta e Malit të Zi) is a travel document issued to Montenegrin citizens for travel abroad.

The passport is issued by the Ministry of Internal Affairs or, if the citizen resides abroad, by a Montenegrin embassy or consulate. Besides serving as proof of identity and citizenship, they facilitate the process of securing assistance from Montenegrin consular officials abroad, if needed. Citizens can not have multiple passports at the same time, unless they are of different category.

== History ==
The first passports issued in Montenegro are from the 18th century, by Prince-Bishop Vasilije III Petrović-Njegoš.

After Vasilije, ethnicity was never a part of Montenegrin passports again. During the reign of Prince-Bishop Petar I Petrović-Njegoš, a special document known as "passport" (Montenegrin: Пасош) was granted to the citizens who wanted extraordinarily to visit foreign countries.

During the reign of Prince-Bishop Petar II Petrović-Njegoš, he granted special Montenegrin bills of passage. From then on, next to every user of the bill and subsequent passports, "Montenegrin" was added, relating to the country of birth. It also introduced the notification of which clan the individual is from. Later, Njegos formally instituted the official name as the "Montenegrin passport". It was composed of the seal of the Cetinje Metropolitanate's righteous soviet, a bicephalic white eagle with spread-out wings, an Eastern Orthodox cross between his heads, and a passing lion beneath it, altogether on a red background.

With the secularization of Montenegro as a formal princedom under Prince Danilo I Petrovic-Njegos, religious affiliation and even physical description of the passport holder were introduced as of the mid 19th century, in attempt to prevent fraud. The seal was replaced with Danil's coat of arms, the lion was moved onto a red shield on the eagle's chest, and an imperial crown was added.

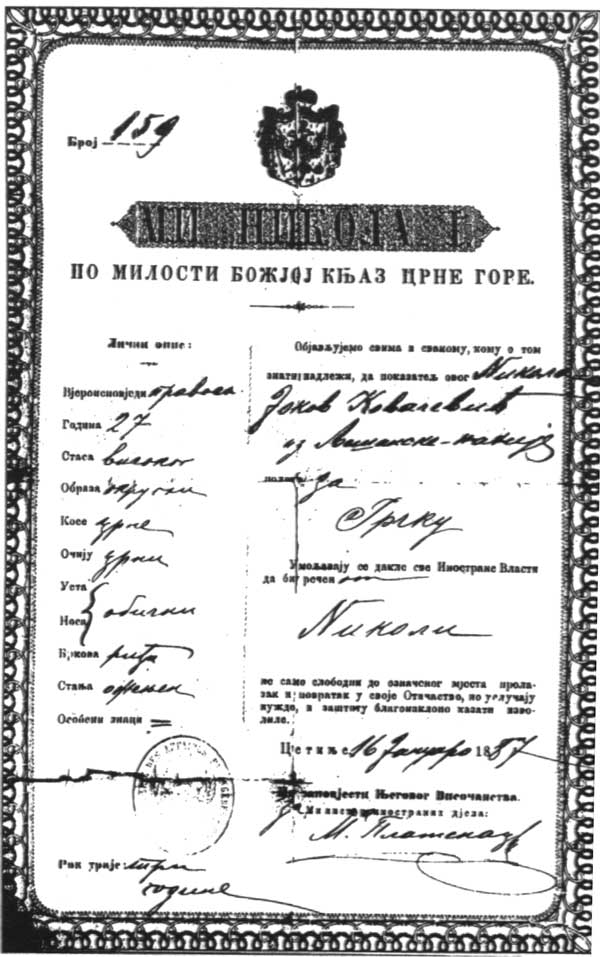
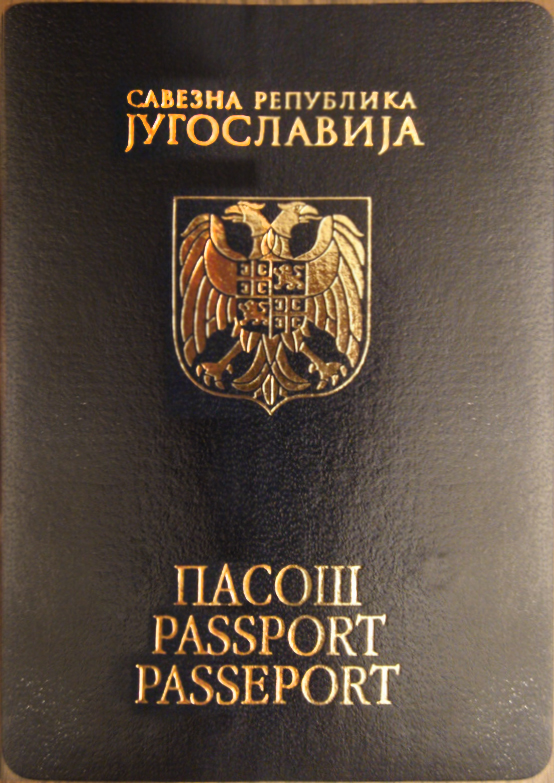
Passport issued in Montenegro in 1887 (prior to the advent of photography, passports had a description of the bearer) (left) and the front cover of the Federal Republic of Yugoslavia passport (right).

The passports issued by Nikola I Petrovic-Njegos were significantly changed in appearance, also losing any reference to nationality. The same were the unrecognized passports published by the Montenegrin government-in-exile in 1919, after the country's annexation by Serbia.

Following the breakup of Yugoslavia, passports were issued in order with the Law on Travel Documents of Yugoslav Nationals, which came into force on 26 July 1996, although the country came into existence in 1992. They were navy blue in color and have two inscriptions in golden letters – Савезна Република Југославија (Federal Republic of Yugoslavia) at the top and the word "passport" written in three languages: Serbian (Cyrillic script), English, and French at the bottom divided by the coat of arms. Following the restructuring of the FRY into the State Union of Serbia and Montenegro in 2003, passports with the new name were not issued due to the expected breakup of the union, which eventually happened in 2006.

Following Montenegro's independence, citizens of Montenegro used the same travel document as Serbia until 2008, the only difference being in issuing authority, in this case, the Ministry of Interior of Montenegro.

On 30 November 2006, the government adopted the Memorandum of Agreement between the Republic of Montenegro and the Republic of Serbia on Consular Protection and Services to the Citizens of Montenegro. By this agreement Serbia, through its network of diplomatic and consular missions, provides consular services to the Montenegrin citizens on the territory of states in which Montenegro has no missions of its own.

On 1 January 2010, the government officially invalidated all non-biometric Montenegrin passports, even if the expiry date was beyond 1 January 2010. Because non-biometric Montenegrin passports were no longer considered valid travel documents from that date onwards, holders were obliged to apply for new biometric Montenegrin passports to travel.

== Appearance ==
=== Design ===
The current passports are burgundy-red with the Montenegrin coat of arms. The data page is printed in Montenegrin, English, and French. Unlike previous passports issued in Montenegro, which used both the Cyrillic and Latin alphabets, this passport uses the Latin alphabet exclusively.

=== Integrated biodata card ===
The passport includes the following data:

- Type ('P' for passport)
- Country code ('MNE' for Montenegro)
- Passport no
- Surname
- Given names
- Nationality ('CRNOGORSKO' for Montenegrin)
- Date of birth (DD.MM.YYYY)
- Personal no (JMBG)
- Sex
- Place of birth
- Date of issue (DD.MM.YYYY)
- Issuing authority (Ministry of Interior of Montenegro)
- Date of expiry (DD.MM.YYYY)
- Signature
- Holder's portrait

The information page ends with the machine-readable zone. The Integrated biodata card also contains the RFID chip.

==== Languages ====
The data page is printed in Montenegrin, English, and French, while the personal data is entered in Montenegrin.

== Types of passports ==
Passports that can be issued are:

- Ordinary passports, which are issued to all citizens.

- Valid for 10 years

- Collective passports, which are issued to groups traveling together.

- Valid for a single trip abroad.
- Though it is not primary means of international travel for organised groups, it is often used to facilitate the issuance of visas or to decrease administrative costs if a lot of group members do not have their individual passports. Main users of these passports are high schools and tourist agencies.
- Collective passports can be used for travel only to specific, usually nearby, countries. Some countries that do not accept collective passport as valid travel ID, do issue collective visas, but still stamp individual passports.
- All members of the group must cross the border at the same time and be part of the same organized trip.

- Diplomatic passports, which are issued by Ministry of Foreign Affairs to diplomats, high-ranking officials, members of the parliament, and persons traveling on official state business, and in some cases to immediate family members of the above.

- Validity is determined by the nature of the position held – diplomats and officials will usually receive the passport covering their mandate in office.

- Official passports are identical in all aspects to the diplomatic passport, but lack the privileges of diplomatic immunity. They are issued to mid- and low-ranking officials, as well as to non-diplomatic staff at embassies and consulates.

== Documents required to obtain a passport ==
- Previously issued passport
- National ID (adults only)
- Birth certificate or certificate of citizenship, as well as a certificate of residence
- Certificate of citizenship (not older than 6 months)
- Issuing fee (EUR 15.00)
- Tax payment certificate (EUR 25.00)

== Visa requirements for Montenegrin citizens ==
Visa requirements for Montenegrin citizens Montenegro Visa free Visa issued upon arrival eVisa Visa available both on arrival or online Visa required prior to arrival

As of 2025, Montenegrin citizens had visa-free or visa on arrival access to 133 countries and territories, ranking the Montenegrin passport 41st in the world

Montenegrin citizens have visa-free access to all countries of the Schengen area. Montenegro's visa policy works similarly granting visa-free entry to all EU member states. Besides them and 70 other countries, all visitors to Montenegro will need a visa.

== Citizenship by investment ==
In 2019 the government of Montenegro launched the Montenegro Citizenship by Investment Program. There were two ways to participate in the program:

- to invest EUR 450,000 to development projects in the capital of Podgorica or in the coastal regions, or
- to invest EUR 250,000 to development projects in northern or central Montenegro, excluding Podgorica

Applications are processed within 8–10 months. Successful applicants are granted full Montenegrin citizenship and are exempt from the country’s restrictions on dual citizenship.

== See also ==
- Visa requirements for Montenegrin citizens
- Visa policy of Montenegro
- Montenegrin identity card
- Montenegrin nationality law
- List of passports
