= OIB =

OIB may refer to:

- Ocean island basalts, rocks
- Office for Infrastructure and logistics – Brussels
- Option Internationale du Baccalauréat of the French baccalauréat
- Orient-Institut Beirut, a research institute in Lebanon
- Personal identification number (Croatia)
