= Montenegrin identity card =

National identity card of Montenegro

Montenegrin identity card (Lična karta)
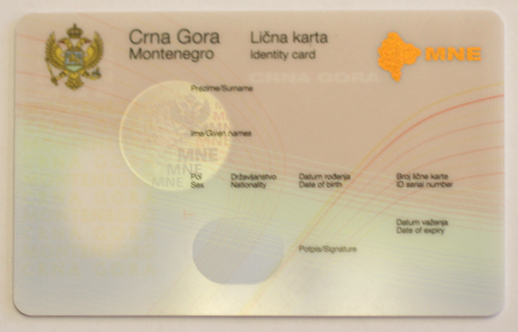
- Montenegrin identity card
- Type: Identity card, optional replacement for passport in the listed countries
- Issued by: Montenegro
- Valid in: Montenegro Albania; Bosnia and Herzegovina; Kosovo; North Macedonia; Serbia
- Eligibility: 14 years of age

Montenegrin identity card (Montenegrin / Serbian: Лична карта, Albanian: Letërnjoftim, Bosnian: Lična Karta, Croatian: Osobna iskaznica) is the national identification card used in Montenegro. Though Lična karta is a primary photo ID, Montenegrin passport and national driver's license are used as valid photo IDs for various purposes. It is issued to all Montenegrin citizens residing in the country above 16 years of age, while it's required for those over the age of 18.

== Appearance ==
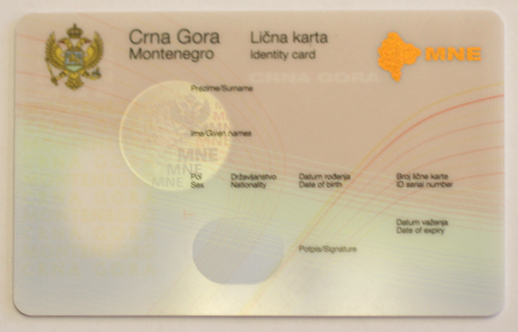
The front of a Lična karta

Montenegrin I.D is similar to a credit card, the identity card is plastic and rectangular in shape, 86 × 54 millimeters in size, as the same shape and size as many other ID cards, as specified by the ISO/IEC 7810 standard. On the left side is a photograph of bearer, it features a light pink, green in middle and blue color. On left side there is also a hologram, which shows Coat of Arms of Montenegro, map of country and country code: MNE. There is also a small hologram in lower part which shows a small photograph bearer and date of birth. On the top edge of the card, the name of Montenegro is available in two languages, Montenegrin and English (Crna Gora/Montenegro), below the name of the card is available in the same two languages (Lična karta/Identity card). On upper right corner there is small map of Montenegro in orange color which changes in other colors depending on angle of view (yellow, green). On the right side 2 letters are engraved "CG" (short of "Crna Gora") which you can see when rotating the card.

Language used on the form is Montenegrin and English, however, personal data is printed only in Montenegrin. Montenegrin citizens who are members of a national minority have the option to have the form of their Lična karta printed in Montenegrin, English, while personal data will be entered in native language (for example in Cyrillic script, or Albanian language).

Lična karta includes the following data:

- Prezime / Surname
- Ime / Given name
- Pol / Sex
- Državljanstvo / Nationality
- Datum rođenja / Date of birth
- Broj lične karte / ID serial number
- Važi do / Valid until
- Potpis / Signature
- Jedinstveni matični broj (JMBG) / Unique citizen number
- Datum izdavanja / Issuing date
- Organ izdavanja / Issuing authority

Validity of the identity document is five years from the date of handing in the application, while processing time is up to 15 days.

== Machine readable zone ==
The data of the machine readable zone consists of three rows of 30 characters each. The only characters used are those of Montenegrin Latin alphabet, except for the letters with diacritics (ŠĐĆČČ – they are replaced by appropriate letter without a diacritical mark), 0–9 and the filler character <. The zone starts with IDMNE.

== Requirements ==
To acquire ID card for the first time, a citizen must present a birth certificate and a proof of citizenship, as well as the expired old style Lična karta. In case of a renewal, only taxes are paid and a new photo is taken at the police station.

== International travel ==
The card can be used for traveling to and staying in countries that have special agreements with Montenegrin Government without the need for a passport:

Countries (and territories)	Restrictions	Agreement
Albania	NO	YES
Bosnia and Herzegovina	NO	YES
Kosovo	NO	YES
North Macedonia	NO	YES
Serbia	NO	YES

== See also ==
- List of identity card policies by country
- Montenegrin nationality law
