= JMBG protests =

Demonstrations in Sarajevo, Bosnia and Herzegovina

2013 JMBG protests
- Protesters in front of the Parliament building, 1 July 2013
- Date: 5 June – July 2013 (1 month)
- Location: Sarajevo, Bosnia and Herzegovina
- Caused by: Suspension of JMBG law, depriving citizens of a unique identification number, required to obtain legal documentation
- Goals: Political reform; Improvement of living standards
- Methods: Protests; Demonstrations
- Status: Ended

The JMBG protests were demonstrations in Sarajevo, Bosnia and Herzegovina between June–July 2013. The acronym JMBG stands for Jedinstveni matični broj građana (Unique Master Citizen Number), the identification number granted to citizens.

Due to political bickering along ethnic lines, the assignment of JMBG was allowed to expire in February 2013 by the politicians representing the ethnic groups that constitute Bosnia. As a result, children born after February were not assigned a JMBG number and, therefore, could not obtain medical cards or passports.

== Etymology ==
The protests have been called Bebolucija (lit. 'Baby Revolution') and the JMBG protests.

== Background ==
In May 2011, the Constitutional Court of Bosnia and Herzegovina declared the law on Unique Master Citizen Numbers (JMBG), which is needed to request passports and other administrative documents, was unconstitutional, due to the fact that one of its articles did not contain the new names of a handful of municipalities in the Serb entity, Republika Srpska.

The Court ordered the Bosnian Parliament to amend the law within six months. But as the six-month period elapsed and no decision was reached by parliament members, the Court suspended the law altogether in January 2013.

As a result of the blocked legislation, babies born after February 2013 did not have passports or health insurance because those demand a personal ID number.

== Protests ==
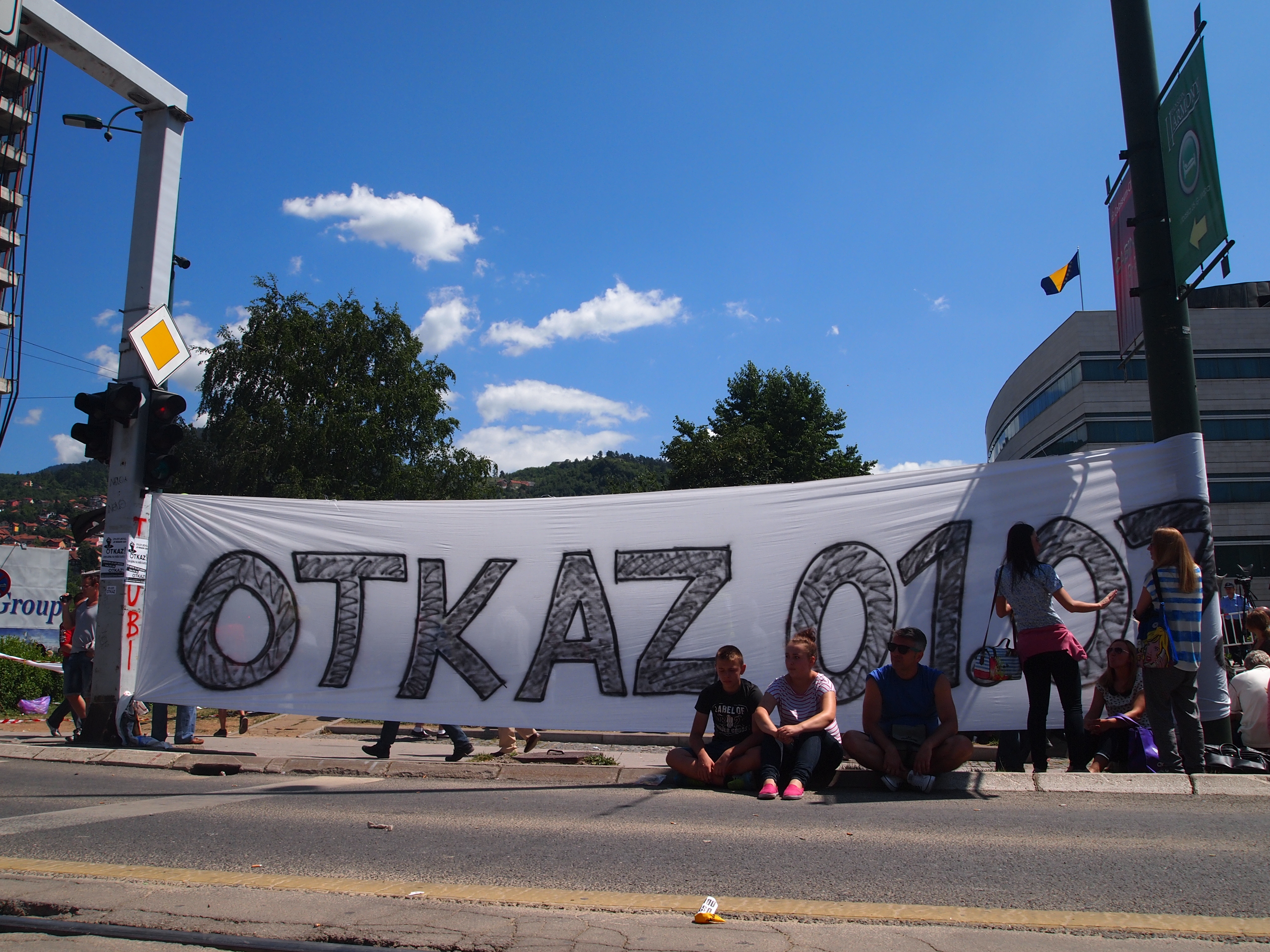
Writing placed by the protestors in front of the Parliament building, it reads "Resignation!" (Bosnian: Otkaz!)

The protests started on 5 June 2013 when a group of citizens gathered in front of the Parliament building to protest. As the protest grew, thousands more arrived, determined to stay until the issue was resolved. By 11 June, an estimated 10,000 protesters were present around parliament.

Continuing protests urged lawmakers to pass a law to prevent such situations in the future by passing legislation to put in place a new identification system. The government began issuing temporary identification documents, but protesters demanded a more permanent solution.

Young mothers with babies without personal documents pushed their carriages between protesters and special police forces, while Sarajevo cabdrivers blocked streets around the building.

At the midst of the protests, on 16 June 2013, three-month old Berina Hamidović died as a result of being denied entry into neighboring Serbia for emergency medical care because the infant couldn't get a passport due to not being granted an identification number. Protesters held a candle-lit vigil outside parliament to mourn her death and demand change. Protesters set the deadline of 30 June 2013 for a new law.

== Reaction ==
Amnesty International released a statement saying the "delay in adopting a new law in Bosnia and Herzegovina, assigning personal identification numbers to the new born citizens of Bosnia and Herzegovina constitutes an illegal attack on the country's citizens' basic human rights."

== See also ==
- 2014 unrest in Bosnia and Herzegovina
