= Croatian identity card =

Identity document issued in Croatia

Croatian identity card Osobna iskaznica
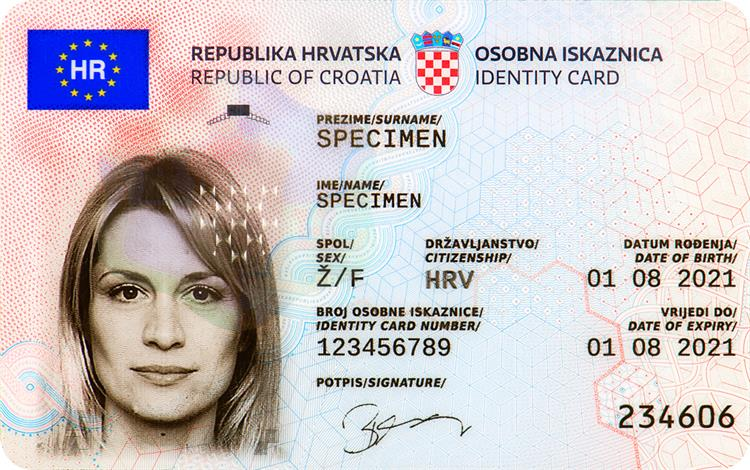

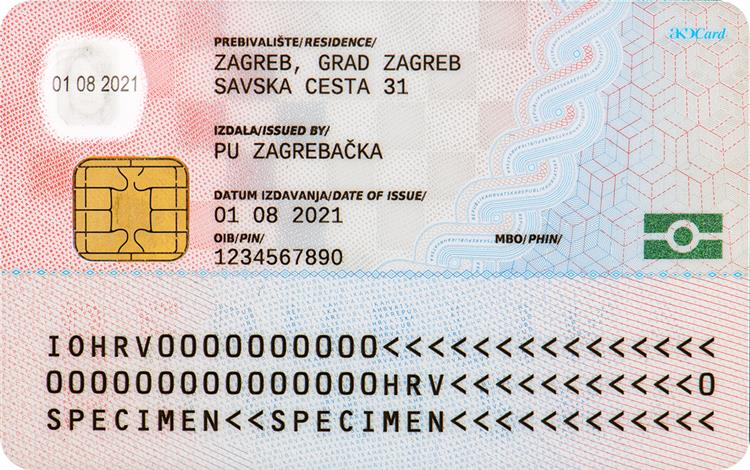
- Type: Identity card, optional replacement for passport in the listed countries
- Issued by: Croatia
- Valid in: EFTA; European Union; United Kingdom (EU Settlement Scheme); Rest of Europe (except Belarus, Russia and Ukraine) Georgia; Montserrat (max. 14 days); Overseas France
- Eligibility: Croatian citizenship
- Expiration: 5 years; 40 years (age 70 or over)

The Croatian identity card (Croatian: Osobna iskaznica) is an identity document issued in Croatia. Every Croatian citizen can obtain an ID card, and it is compulsory for all citizens over the age of 18 living in Croatia. This document is issued by the police on behalf of the Ministry of the Interior.

The 2003, 2013 and 2021 versions of the ID card are valid as travel documents in most of Europe. The pre-2003 version is valid only in Croatia.

== History ==
SR Croatia issued identity cards during the time of SFR Yugoslavia since 1974. When the country became independent, a new identity card replaced the old one with a two-year transition period.

== Physical appearance ==
Similarly to a credit card, the identity card is plastic and rectangular in shape, with dimensions 86 by 54 millimetres (3.4 by 2.1 in).

=== 2003 version ===
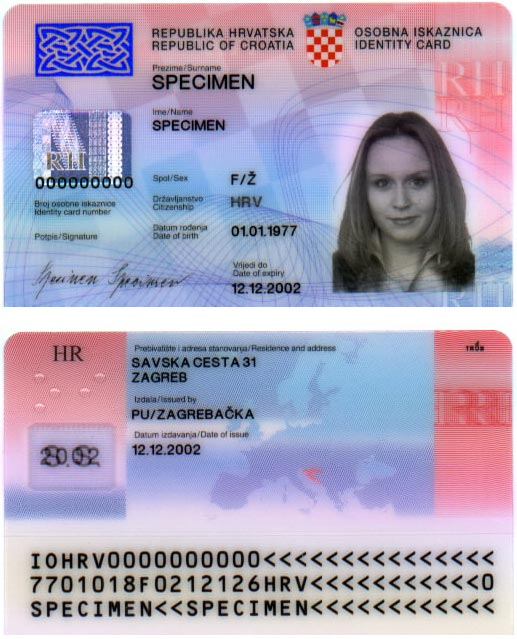
Version issued 2003–2013

On the left side is a hologram, on the right side is the photograph of the bearer. On the top edge of the card, the name of Republic of Croatia available in two languages, Croatian and English (REPUBLIKA HRVATSKA / REPUBLIC OF CROATIA), below the name of the card is available in the same two languages (OSOBNA ISKAZNICA / IDENTITY CARD).

The descriptions of the fields are printed in Croatian and English.

- Front side:
  - Surname
  - Name
  - Sex
  - Identity card number
  - Citizenship
  - Signature
  - Date of birth
  - Date of expiry
- Back side:
  - Residence and address
  - Issued by
  - Date of issue
  - Machine-readable data

=== 2013 version ===
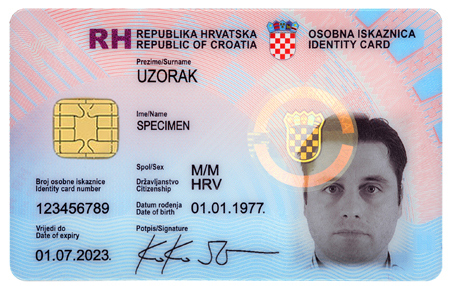

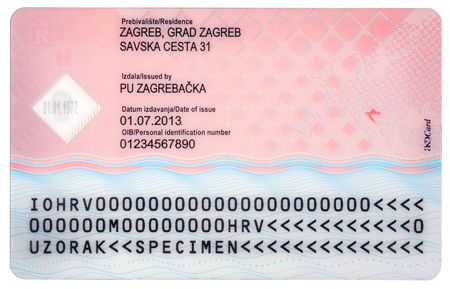
Version issued 2013–2021

The 2013 version was redesigned to be compatible for the installation of an Electronic identity card chip. Issuing of electronic ID cards began in 2015. In addition to all data on the 2003 version, the back side of the new ID card also features the personal identification number (OIB).

=== 2021 version ===
The second generation electronic ID came out in 2021. The first day when the applications for the new ID card started to be accepted was 2 August 2021. The new, second generation eID was a change that followed new EU Regulation 2019/1157. Thus the greatest change is that second generation eID is also bio-metric. This change is followed with new Certilia application that enables citizens to use the new eID to sign electronic documents with digital signature.

== Fines ==
Persons over the age of 18, and who do not have a valid ID, can pay a fine from €390 up to €590. Failure to show a valid ID to a police officer in a public place can result in a fine of €20.

== International travel ==
Since Croatia's accession to the EU, in accordance with the Treaty of Accession 2011, on 1 July 2013 the Croatian identity card (except for the pre-2003 version) became a valid travel document within the entire European Economic Area. Croatia finished negotiating their accession to the EEA in November 2013.

Today, the card is a valid travel document in almost all of Europe (except Belarus, Russia, Ukraine, and the United Kingdom) as well as in Georgia and French overseas territories.

== See also ==
- Croatian passport
- Croatian nationality law
- National identity cards in the European Economic Area
- List of identity card policies by country
