= Visa policy of Montenegro =

Policy on permits required to enter Montenegro

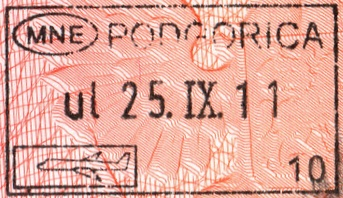
Entry stamp

Visitors to Montenegro must obtain a visa from one of the Montenegrin diplomatic missions unless they are citizens of one of the visa-exempt countries. Visa policy is regulated by Regulation on Visa Regime Act. Where there are no diplomatic or consular representations of Montenegro, visa requiring foreigners may obtain them from (depending on the country) diplomatic or consular representations of Serbia, Bulgaria and Croatia.

The visa policy of Montenegro is similar to the visa policy of the Schengen Area. It grants 90-day visa-free entry to all citizens of Schengen Annex II.

According to the Law on Foreigners, visitors must have a passport that is valid for at least 3 months beyond the period of intended stay. However, Timatic indicates that visa-exempt nationals need only present a passport valid on arrival to Montenegro.

== Visa policy map ==
Visa policy of Montenegro Montenegro Visa not required - may enter with an ID card (90 days) Visa not required (90 days) Visa not required (30 days) Visa required

== Visa exemption ==
=== Ordinary passports ===
Holders of ordinary passports of the following countries and territories may enter Montenegro without a visa for the following period:

90 days within any 180 days

- All European Union member states^{ID}

- Albania^{ID}
- Andorra
- Antigua and Barbuda
- Argentina
- Australia
- Bahamas
- Barbados
- Bosnia and Herzegovina^{ID}
- Brazil
- Brunei
- Canada
- Chile
- Colombia
- Costa Rica
- Dominica
- El Salvador
- Georgia
- Grenada
- Guatemala
- Hong Kong
- Honduras
- Iceland^{ID}
- Israel
- Japan
- Kiribati
- Kosovo^{ID}
- Liechtenstein^{ID}
- Macau
- Malaysia
- Marshall Islands
- Mauritius
- Mexico
- Micronesia
- Moldova
- Monaco^{ID}
- New Zealand
- Nicaragua
- North Macedonia^{ID}
- Norway^{ID}
- Palau
- Panama
- Paraguay
- Saint Kitts and Nevis
- Saint Lucia
- Saint Vincent and the Grenadines
- Samoa
- San Marino^{ID}
- Serbia^{ID}
- Seychelles
- Singapore
- Solomon Islands
- South Korea
- Switzerland^{ID}
- Taiwan^{2}
- Timor-Leste
- Tonga
- Trinidad and Tobago
- Tuvalu
- Ukraine
- United Arab Emirates
- United Kingdom^{1}
- United States
- Uruguay
- Vatican City
- Venezuela

30 days

- Peru

_{ID - May enter with an ID card (including Irish passport card) and stay without a residence permit for up to 30 days.}
_{1 - Including holders of valid travel documents issued in the British Overseas Territories: Anguilla, Bermuda, the British Antarctic Territory, the British Indian Ocean Territory, the British Virgin Islands, the Cayman Islands, the Falkland Islands, Gibraltar, Montserrat, Pitcairn Island, Saint Helena, Ascension, and Tristan da Cunha, South Georgia and the South Sandwich Islands, and the Turks and Caicos Islands.}
_{2 - Provided a passport includes a Personal ID number.}

- Holders of a Laissez-Passer, issued by the United Nations, provided traveling on duty may enter Montenegro without a visa for up to 90 days.
- Holders of a Interpol Travel Document, issued by Interpol, provided traveling on duty may enter Montenegro without a visa for up to 90 days.

Date of visa changes

Cancelled:

- 29 October 2025: Armenia, Egypt, Kuwait, Uzbekistan
- 15 January 2026: Azerbaijan
- 1 November 2026: Belarus, Russia, Saudi Arabia, Turkey

==== Substitute visa ====
Holders of a valid visa or residence permit issued by any Schengen Area member state, Australia, Canada, Ireland, Japan, New Zealand, the United Kingdom or the United States may enter Montenegro without a visa for up to 30 days. The visa or residency document must be valid for the period of stay.

=== Non-ordinary passports ===
In addition to countries whose citizens are visa-exempt, citizens of the following countries may enter Montenegro without a visa for the following period:

90 days

- Armenia
- Egypt^{D}
- Guinea
- Indonesia
- Iran
- Kazakhstan
- Kyrgyzstan
- Mongolia
- Morocco
- Pakistan
- Tajikistan
- Thailand
- Türkiye
- Vietnam
- Zimbabwe

30 days

- China
- North Korea

_{D - Diplomatic passports only.}

=== Future changes ===
Montenegro has signed visa exemption agreements with the following countries, but they have not yet entered into force:

Country	Passports	Agreement signed on
Jordan	Diplomatic, service	28 October 2026

== See also ==
- Visa policy of the Schengen Area
- Visa requirements for Montenegrin citizens
