= Unique Master Citizen Number =

ID system in most former Yugoslav republics

Unique Master Citizen Number (Serbo-Croatian: Jedinstveni matični broj građana / Јединствени матични број грађана, JMBG / ЈМБГ, Macedonian: Единствен матичен број на граѓанинот, ЕМБГ, Slovene: enotna matična številka občana, EMŠO) is an identification number that was assigned to every citizen of former Yugoslav republics of the SFR Yugoslavia. It continues to be used in its original form in Bosnia and Herzegovina, Montenegro, North Macedonia, Serbia and Slovenia.

Croatia has switched to a new identification number called the Personal Identification Number (Osobni identifikacijski broj, OIB).

== History ==
The JMBG was introduced in the Socialist Federal Republic of Yugoslavia on January 8, 1977 and applied to all citizens born before then and alive at the time. All six republics passed a law on the Unique Master Citizen Number.

Although the Republic of Croatia continued to use the JMBG after gaining independence in 2002 the official name of the number there was changed to Matični broj građana (Master Citizen Number), acronym MBG. Advocates of the right to privacy argued that JMBG was a piece of personally identifiable information that needed to be protected by information privacy law, mostly because it was unique and it included the person's date of birth. When the law to that effect was passed in 2003 JMBG was removed from identity cards, driver's licenses and similar documents. In 2009, Croatia passed a new law that introduced a different unique identifier called the Personal Identification Number (Croatian: Osobni identifikacijski broj, OIB). The OIB consists of 11 randomly chosen digits and has been assigned to all Croatian citizens, companies registered in Croatia and foreign nationals residing in Croatia. MBG no longer appears on Croatian identity cards since 2003, instead OIB does, since 2013. Since 2023, the OIB is exclusively used in Croatia.

In Bosnia and Herzegovina in 2001 the official name of the number was changed to Jedinstveni matični broj (Unique Master Number), although acronym JMBG is still in use.

== Composition ==
The number is made up of 13 digits in a form "DD MM YYY RR BBB K" (whitespaces are for convenience; digits are written without separation) where:

DD – day of birth

MM – month of birth

YYY – last three digits of the year of birth

RR – political region of birth (for persons born before 1976, political region where they were first registered)
- 01-08 – foreign citizens without citizenship of former Yugoslavia or succeeding countries (foreign citizens that receive citizenship also receive a 'regular' JMBG, not this 'foreigners only' one)
  - 01 – foreigners in Bosnia and Herzegovina
  - 02 – foreigners in Montenegro
  - 03 – foreigners in Croatia
  - 04 – foreigners in Macedonia
  - 05 – foreigners in Slovenia
  - 06 – foreigners in Central Serbia
  - 07 – foreigners in Vojvodina
  - 08 – foreigners in Kosovo
- 00 and 09 – naturalized citizens which had no republican citizenship
- 10–19 – Bosnia and Herzegovina
  - 10 – Banja Luka
  - 11 – Bihać
  - 12 – Doboj
  - 13 – Goražde
  - 14 – Livno
  - 15 – Mostar
  - 16 – Prijedor
  - 17 – Sarajevo
  - 18 – Tuzla
  - 19 – Zenica

- 20–29 – Montenegro
  - 20 – (not in use)
  - 21 – Podgorica, Danilovgrad, Kolašin
  - 22 – Bar, Ulcinj
  - 23 – Budva, Kotor, Tivat
  - 24 – Herceg Novi
  - 25 – Cetinje
  - 26 – Nikšić, Plužine, Šavnik
  - 27 – Berane, Rožaje, Plav, Andrijevica
  - 28 – Bijelo Polje, Mojkovac
  - 29 – Pljevlja, Žabljak

- 30–39 – Croatia (no longer used)
  - 30 – Osijek, Slavonia region
  - 31 – Bjelovar, Virovitica, Koprivnica, Pakrac, Podravina region
  - 32 – Varaždin, Međimurje region
  - 33 – Zagreb
  - 34 – Karlovac, Kordun region
  - 35 – Gospić, Lika region
  - 36 – Rijeka, Pula, Gorski kotar, Istria and Croatian Littoral regions
  - 37 – Sisak, Banovina region
  - 38 – Split, Zadar, Šibenik, Dubrovnik, Dalmatia region
  - 39 – Hrvatsko Zagorje and mixed
- 41–49 – Macedonia
  - 41 – Bitola
  - 42 – Kumanovo
  - 43 – Ohrid
  - 44 – Prilep
  - 45 – Skopje
  - 46 – Strumica
  - 47 – Tetovo
  - 48 – Veles
  - 49 – Štip

- 50–59 – Slovenia (only 50 was used until 2024)
- 60–69 – (Citizens with temporary residence)

- 70–79 – Central Serbia
  - 70 – Serbian citizens registered abroad at a Serbian diplomatic/consular post (section 4 of the JMBG Law)
  - 71 – Belgrade region (City of Belgrade)
  - 72 – Šumadija and Pomoravlje regions (Šumadija District and Pomoravlje District)
  - 73 – Niš region (Nišava District, Pirot District and Toplica District)
  - 74 – Southern Morava region (Jablanica District and Pčinja District)
  - 75 – Zaječar region (Zaječar District and Bor District)
  - 76 – Podunavlje region (Podunavlje District and Braničevo District)
  - 77 – Podrinje and Kolubara regions (Mačva District and Kolubara District)
  - 78 – Kraljevo region (Raška District, Moravica District and Rasina District)
  - 79 – Užice region (Zlatibor District)

- 80–89 – Autonomous province of Vojvodina
  - 80 – Novi Sad region (South Bačka District)
  - 81 – Sombor region (West Bačka District)
  - 82 – Subotica region (North Bačka District)
  - 84 – Kikinda region (North Banat District)
  - 85 – Zrenjanin region (Central Banat District)
  - 86 – Pančevo region (South Banat District)
  - 87 – Vršac region (South Banat District)
  - 88 – Ruma region (part of Syrmia District)
  - 89 – Sremska Mitrovica region (part of Syrmia District)

- 90–99 – Autonomous province of Kosovo
  - 91 – Priština region (Kosovo District)
  - 92 – Kosovska Mitrovica region (Kosovska Mitrovica District)
  - 93 – Peć region (part of Peć District)
  - 94 – Đakovica region (part of Peć District)
  - 95 – Prizren region (Prizren District)
  - 96 – Gnjilane region (Kosovo-Pomoravlje District)

BBB – unique number of the particular RR (represents a person within the DDMMYYYRR section in the particular municipality)
- 000–499 – male
- 500–999 – female

K – checksum

=== Checksum calculation ===
The checksum is calculated from the mapping DDMMYYYRRBBBK = abcdefghijklm, using the formula:

m = 11 − (( 7×(a + g) + 6×(b + h) + 5×(c + i) + 4×(d + j) + 3×(e + k) + 2×(f + l) ) mod 11)

- If m is between 1 and 9, the number K is the same as the number m
- If m is 10 or 11 K becomes 0 (zero)

Note: there has been a small number of JMBGs that were assigned by valid authorities but which had an invalid checksum. Also, there are a few duplicate JMBGs in existence. The common anecdotal explanation for these is simple operator error. Reportedly these mistakes happened more often in the early 1990s. The chances of running into exceptions are reportedly low, and whether such exceptions justify questioning the use of JMBG as a unique identifier has not been scientifically analyzed.

== Example ==
As an example, a valid identification number is 0101006500006; it is the number of the first male baby registered in Slovenia on January 1, 2006.

== See also ==
- National identification number
- JMBG protests
