= Croatian nationality law =

Croatian Citizenship Act

Parliament of Croatia
- Long title: An Act relating to Croatian citizenship
- Enacted by: Government of Croatia
- Status: Current legislation

The Croatian nationality law dates back from 26 June 1991, with multiple amendments over the years, the last one being on 15 December 2021, and an interpretation of the Constitutional Court in 1993. It is based upon the Constitution of Croatia (Chapter II, articles 9 and 10). It is mainly based on jus sanguinis.

== Acquisition of Croatian citizenship ==
Croatian citizenship can be acquired in the following ways:

1. Jus sanguinis: By descent if at least one of the parents is a Croatian citizen, or a proven direct lineage to a Croatian emigrant who left Croatia before 8 October 1991
2. Jus soli: By birth in Croatia (one parent must have Croatian citizenship), or a child found in Croatia whose parents are unknown
3. By naturalisation
4. By international treaties

=== Citizenship by descent ===
Under Article 4 of the Law on Croatian Citizenship, a child acquires Croatian citizenship by origin:

1. if both of the child's parents are Croatian citizens at the time of the child's birth;
2. if one of the child's parents is a Croatian citizen at the time of the child's birth and the child is born in the Republic of Croatia;
3. if one of the child's parents is a Croatian citizen at the time of the child's birth, the other parent without citizenship or of unknown citizenship, and the child is born abroad.

Croatian citizenship may also be acquired by a mix of descent and registration, for a child born abroad, one of whose parents is a Croatian citizen at the moment of the child's birth, "if the child is registered for Croatian citizenship by 21 years of age at a competent authority of the Republic of Croatia abroad or in the Republic of Croatia, or if he settles in the Republic of Croatia", or if the child would not otherwise acquire any citizenship.

=== Citizenship by ancestry ===
It is also possible for emigrants and their descendants (and their spouses) to claim Croatian citizenship under Article 11. An emigrant and their descendants can acquire Croatian citizenship by naturalization. They do not have to:

1. have knowledge of the Croatian language
2. give up any foreign citizenships
3. have ever lived in the territory of the Republic of Croatia

However, Article 11 does not generally apply to migrants who are citizens of other countries and territories of the former Yugoslavia.

=== Citizenship by naturalisation ===
Under Article 8 of the Croatian Citizenship Act, a foreigner can acquire Croatian citizenship by naturalisation if they have submitted a request and fulfils the following requirements:

1. they are 18 years old;
2. they are released from foreign citizenship, or submits proof that they will acquire release if granted Croatian citizenship;
3. they have lived and has had a registered residence in the Republic of Croatia for at least 8 years without interruption until the submission of the request and has been granted foreigner status with permanent residence;
4. they are proficient in the Croatian language and Latin script, and is familiar with Croatian culture and social arrangement;
5. by respecting the legal order of the Republic of Croatia, by paying public contributions, and that there are no security obstacles for them to receive Croatian citizenship.

== Dual citizenship ==
Croatia does not require its citizens to renounce Croatian citizenship when acquiring a new citizenship.

The same cannot be said though, for the reverse. Under Article 8 of the Law on Croatian Citizenship, naturalisation into Croatian citizenship requires renunciation of the previous country's citizenship, where allowed by the other country. However, this does not apply in a number of situations, including descendants of Croatian emigrants, national interest of Croatia, and former Croatians who renounced Croatian citizenship to practice a profession in another country.

== Citizenship of the European Union ==
Because Croatia forms part of the European Union, Croatian citizens are also citizens of the European Union under European Union law and thus enjoy rights of free movement and have the right to vote in elections for the European Parliament. When in a non-EU country where there is no Croatian embassy, Croatian citizens have the right to get consular protection from the embassy of any other EU country present in that country. Croatian citizens can live and work in any country within the EU as a result of the right of free movement and residence granted in Article 21 of the EU Treaty.

== Travel freedom of Croatian citizens ==
Visa requirements for Croatian citizens

Visa requirements for Croatian citizens are administrative entry restrictions by the authorities of other states placed on citizens of Croatia. In 2018, Croatian citizens had visa-free or visa on arrival access to 156 countries and territories, ranking the Croatian passport 20th in terms of travel freedom according to the Henley visa restrictions index.

In 2017, the Croatian nationality is ranked twenty-eighth in the Nationality Index (QNI). This index differs from the Visa Restrictions Index, which focuses on external factors including travel freedom. The QNI considers, in addition to travel freedom, on internal factors such as peace & stability, economic strength, and human development as well.
