= Montenegrin nationality law =

Montenegrin Citizenship Act

Parliament of Montenegro
- Long title: An Act relating to Montenegrin citizenship
- Enacted by: Government of Montenegro
- Status: Current legislation

Citizenship of Montenegro is the citizenship of Montenegro. It is regulated by a citizenship law, ratified by Parliament in 2008 and published by the Official Journal of Montenegro (No. 13/2008). It is mainly based on jus sanguinis. There are also provisions for citizenship-by-investment, though the government has suspended the relevant guidelines in the face of European Union concern.

== History ==
=== Origin ===
The concept of citizenship in Montenegrin law can be traced back to the laws promulgated in 1803 by Petar I Petrović-Njegoš, which articulated the principle of jus sanguinis in reference to Crnogorac (Montenegrins) and Brdjanin (Highlanders), and then to the legal code of 1855, which reiterated the earlier principles and also granted foreigners the right to reside in Montenegro. In 1905, Nicholas I of Montenegro's "Statute of Montenegro" promulgated further guidelines, for the first time using the term "Montenegrin citizens" instead of "Montenegrins" and "Highlanders", and also establishing the right of renunciation of citizenship after completion of military service. However the law did not spell out the guidelines for acquisition of citizenship.

=== Kingdom of Yugoslavia and Socialist Federal Republic of Yugoslavia ===
When Montenegro was a part of Yugoslavia, it had citizenship policies in common with the rest of the country. The Kingdom of Yugoslavia passed a formal citizenship act in 1928, establishing that citizenship would be acquired by patrilineal descent. The Socialist Federal Republic of Yugoslavia (SFRY) for its part passed a citizenship act in 1945, which stated that Yugoslav citizenship was held by people who were citizens under the 1928 act and people who had the ethnicity of one of the Yugoslav republics; it also deprived emigrants of their citizenship, and prohibited multiple citizenship. The constituent republics, including the Socialist Republic of Montenegro, passed their own citizenship acts, which mirrored the federal acts and provided for acquisition of citizenship of the constituent republic along with federal citizenship. Citizenship of a constituent republic came from descent rather than place of birth; in the case of two parents with citizenship of different republics, the citizenship of the child depended on agreement by the parents, or lacking such agreement, a legal determination based on the child's place of residence.

Until the breakup of Yugoslavia there were two further changes to nationality laws, each being passed soon after the adoption of a new Constitution of Yugoslavia. The Citizenship Act of 1964 removed the provisions for depriving emigrants of citizenship, as well as establishing procedures for naturalisation. It also clarified the relationship that if one lost federal citizenship, then republic citizenship would be lost as well. The 1976 Citizenship Act clarified the mechanism for acquisition of citizenship of a republic by citizens of other republics. By the time the federal legislation was passed, the constituent republics had already adopted new citizenship legislation in line with the new constitution. Montenegro was the first to pass such legislation, in May 1975; it would remain in force until 1999.

=== Federal Republic of Yugoslavia and State Union of Serbia and Montenegro ===
The constitution of the Federal Republic of Yugoslavia (FRY, comprising Serbia and Montenegro) passed in 1992 continued the two-tier structure of federal citizenship and republic citizenship. However, the actual citizenship act governing the details of acquisition of citizenship in the FRY was not passed until 1996. It automatically gave citizenship in the FRY to everyone who had republic citizenship of Serbia or of Montenegro under the SFRY. It also provided that people who held SFRY citizenship, were permanently resident on the territory of the FRY at the time of the promulgation of the constitution, and had no other citizenships could apply for FRY citizenship. However it required that they renounce their former citizenship in the process. It also stated that a person acquiring FRY citizenship by naturalisation would also acquire the citizenship of the republic on whose territory the event of naturalisation occurred.

In 1999, as the NATO bombing intensified, Montenegro passed its own nationality law which changed the relationship between federal and republic citizenship, seen as a move to establish greater independence from the federal government. The law provided mechanisms for obtaining Montenegrin citizenship even in the absence of FRY citizenship; it also stated in Article 16 that a Montenegrin citizen who acquired citizenship of another republic or a foreign country would lose his citizenship. It also established particularly stringent criteria for naturalisation, in an effort to prevent refugees from Bosnia and Herzegovina and from Croatia from gaining voting rights in Montenegro. However, there were significant changes to the federal citizenship laws in the aftermath of the overthrow of Slobodan Milošević; specifically, Articles 47 and 48 were modified to permit people who held SFRY citizenship to obtain FRY citizenship without giving up any other citizenship they held, thus effectively permitting multiple citizenship for the first time in the history of the nationality law. Under reformulation of the FRY as the State Union of Serbia and Montenegro in 2003, the Constitutional Charter of Serbia and Montenegro further clarified the relationship between citizenship and voting rights: it stated in Article 7 that citizens of Serbia and of Montenegro residing in the other would each have full rights, but with the specific exception of voting rights. Furthermore, under republic-level law, Montenegrins living in Serbia had no voting rights in Montenegro either. This distribution of voting rights effectively laid the ground for the passage of the Montenegrin independence referendum, 2006.

=== Post-independence ===
After Montenegro became an independent country in 2006, article 12 of the new Constitution of Montenegro passed in 2007 established Montenegrin citizenship. The Law on Implementation allowed people who had dual citizenship before independence to retain that dual citizenship. However, it did not permit people who obtained another citizenship afterwards to retain dual citizenship, instead requiring to give up one or the other citizenship within a year. However this clause was the subject of political tensions, and led to delays in the passage of a formal citizenship act. The Citizenship Act of 2008 clarified the exact mechanisms for gain and loss of citizenship. It also defined the character of citizenship in Montenegro as "civic" rather than "ethnic". It continued to impose strict requirements for naturalisation.

Under the new nationality law, Articles 8 and 9 provide that persons applying for naturalisation in Montenegro must provide proof of having given up their previous citizenship, while Article 24 provides that Montenegrins acquiring citizenship of another country lose their Montenegrin citizenship. However, Article 18 provides exceptions from this general prohibition against multiple nationality in the case of a bilateral treaty between Montenegro and the other country of citizenship. In 2012 it was reported that Montenegro and Serbia were negotiating such a treaty.

== Dual citizenship ==
Montenegro overall does not allow its citizens to hold foreign citizenship in addition to their Montenegrin citizenship.

== Economic citizenship ==
In addition to the rather strict mechanisms for naturalisation, Montenegro has a programme of citizenship-by-investment or economic citizenship (ekonomsko državljanstvo), allowing foreigners to be granted the citizenship of Montenegro at the discretion of the Ministry of Interior Affairs and Public Administration. Though the enabling legislation remains in place, the programme was suspended in November 2010.

Article 12 of the Citizenship Act of 2008 states that "An adult person may be granted Montenegrin citizenship if he or she does not fulfil the requirements referred to in Article 8 of this Law if it would be in the scientific, economic, cultural, sport, national, or other interest of Montenegro". In March 2010, former Prime Minister of Thailand Thaksin Shinawatra received citizenship under this article due to his investments in tourism in Montenegro which were reported to be in the range of millions of Euros, despite pending charges of corruption that had been laid against him in his home country. The move sparked public criticism, but government spokeswoman Olivera Đukanović dismissed the concerns by claiming that other countries had similar programs.

Formal guidelines for the programme were announced in mid-2010; they stated that candidates would require €500,000, of which one portion would be invested inside the country and the rest would have to be contributed to the state budget. In the light of German reports in August that Oleg Deripaska would be granted citizenship under the programme, more criticism emerged. Movement for Changes leader Nebojša Medojević as well as Vanja Ćalović of NGO MANS were quoted as warning that the programme would attract gangsters and increase corruption. Budimir Aleksić of the Poslanik Nove for his part complained that the government would "sell citizenship" while leaving 60,000 residents of Montenegro stateless. Stephan Meyer of Germany's Christian Social Union also spoke out against it, and said it might threaten the recent moves to grant Montenegrin passport-holders visa-free travel within the Schengen Area. However others offered public praise to the programme, including Canadian ambassador to Serbia, Montenegro, and Macedonia John Morrison, who compared it to Canada's own visa policy, which has provisions for granting visas to investors.

Later in August, when rumours surfaced that Serbian businessman Miroslav Mišković was in the process of applying for citizenship under the program, then Prime Minister Milo Đukanović denied the reports, and further stated that the process of receiving applications for economic citizenship under the new guidelines had not yet begun. Then in November 2010, the Montenegrin Ministry of Foreign Affairs formally announced the suspension of the previous guidelines about economic citizenship. Media reports attributed this action to pressure from the European Union, though MFA spokesman Zeljko Stamatović denied it. As of June 2011, the programme remained suspended. According to a Dnevne Novine report; concerns remained that the citizenship-by-investment programme would not attract genuine investors but only people engaged in money laundering and those who sought to hide from crimes committed abroad (as Montenegro does not extradite its citizens). However, others argue that the programme could help in attracting foreign investment capital to Montenegro, especially from Americans living abroad who remain fully subject to U.S. taxation unless they switch citizenships.

In 2019, Montenegro began taking applications for a new program of citizenship by investment. This new program is limited to two thousand successful applicants and will only run for three years maximum. The program is limited to non-EU citizens.

== Visa requirement for Montenegrin citizens ==
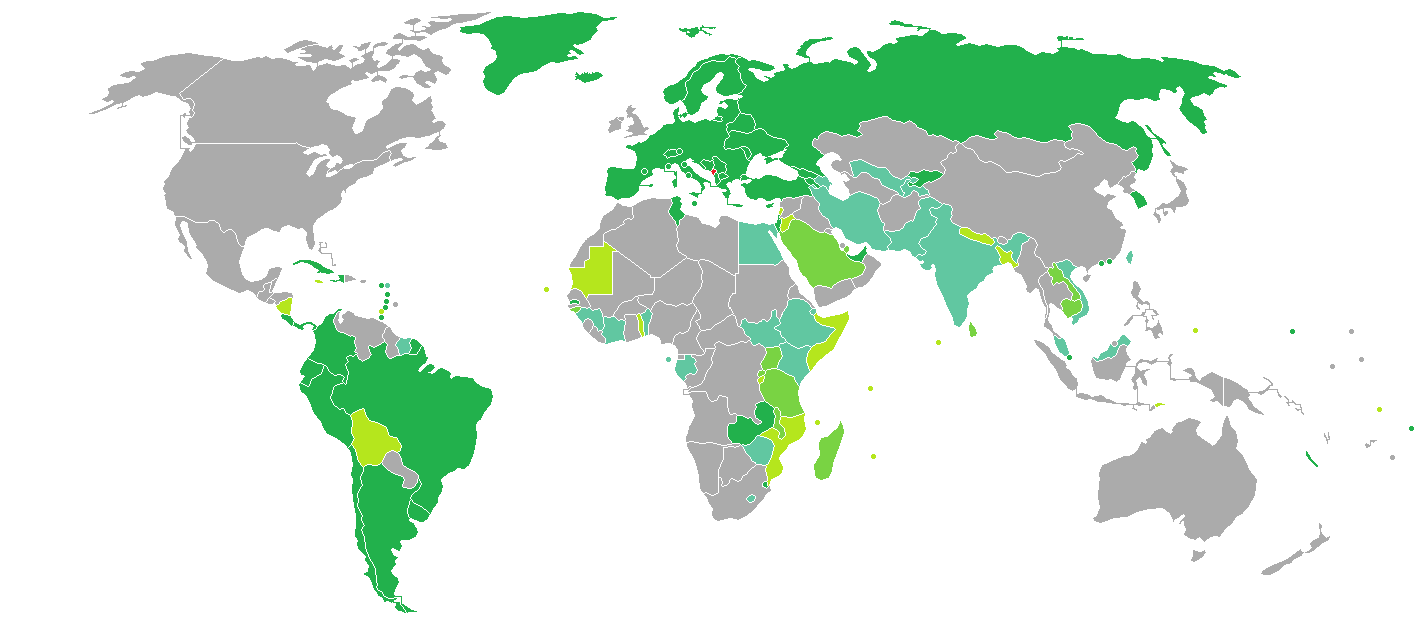

In 2015, Montenegrin citizens had visa-free or visa on arrival access to 104 countries and territories, ranking the Montenegrin passport 48th in the world according to the Visa Restrictions Index.

== Bibliography ==
- Džankić, Jelena (Autumn 2010), Transformations of Citizenship in Montenegro: a context-generated evolution of citizenship policies (PDF), CITSEE Working Paper Series, University of Edinburgh, archived from the original (PDF) on 2012-09-16
- Law on Montenegrin Citizenship (Unofficial Translation) (PDF), United Nations High Commissioner for Refugees, March 2008
- Lilić, Stevan; Janjic, Dušan; Kovačević-Vučo, Biljana (November 2001), Odnosi Između Srbije I Crne Gore I Implikacije Na Državljanski Status Gradana Srj, European Stability Initiative
  - An English summary is available as: Lawyers' Committee for Human Rights - YUCOM (November 2001), Serbian-Montenegrin Relations and the Question of Citizenship of FRY Citizens (Executive Summary), European Stability Initiative
