= Personal identification number (Croatia) =

Croatian national identification number

The Personal identification number (Croatian: Osobni identifikacijski broj or OIB) is a permanent national identification number of every Croatian citizen and legal persons domiciled in the Republic of Croatia. OIB is determined and assigned by the Tax Administration (Porezna uprava) of the Croatian Ministry of Finance. Personal identification number gradually replaced the Unique Master Citizen Number (JMBG), which had been set up and used in former Yugoslavia.

== Characteristics ==
OIB consists of 11 digits which contain no personal information, unlike the previous unique identification number scheme. The OIB is constructed from ten randomly chosen digits and one digit control number (international standard ISO 7064, module 11.10). For the purposes of international data exchange, the letters HR are added preceding the eleven digits.

== Introduction process ==
The introduction of personal identification number was a gradual process in two phases:

- the first phase is the definition and assignment of a personal identification number to everyone
- the second phase is the entering of the personal identification numbers into all official records

The first phase was implemented throughout the year 2009. During the same year, OIBs were used concurrently with JMBGs on all applications and payments.

Starting with 1 January 2010, tax returns and all payments use OIB only.

Starting with 1 January 2011, it became illegal to collect JMBG's where OIB would have sufficed, because under Croatian law, JMBG is considered to be a piece of personally identifiable information that is protected under the law on the protection of personal information, whereas OIB is not. The penalty for not using OIBs is defined as large monetary fines, multiplied for each violation.

== See also ==
- National identification number

== Sources ==
- Croatian Parliament (2008-05-16). "Zakon o osobnom identifikacijskom broju". NN 60/08 (in Croatian). Narodne novine.
- Ministry of Finance of the Republic of Croatia (2009-01-02). "Pravilnik o osobnom identifikacijskom broju". NN 01/09 (in Croatian). Narodne novine.
