= Serbian identity card =

National identity card of Serbia

Serbian identity card Лична карта
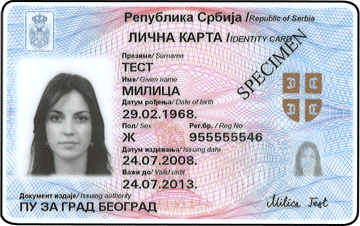
- The front of a contemporary Serbian biometric identity card

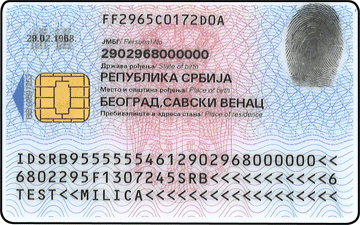
- The back of a contemporary Serbian biometric identity card
- Type: Compulsory identity document; optional replacement for passport in the listed countries/territories
- Issued by: Serbia
- Purpose: Identification
- Valid in: Serbia Albania; Bosnia and Herzegovina; Kosovo; Montenegro; North Macedonia
- Eligibility: 10 years of age
- Expiration: 5 years (age 10–17); 10 years (age 18–65); No expiry (age 65 and older)
- Size: ID-1

Serbian identity card (Serbian: Лична карта, romanized: Lična karta) is the national identification card used in Serbia. The document is issued by the Serbian Police on behalf of the Ministry of Internal Affairs and is the main form of identification on the territory of the Republic of Serbia. Although it can be issued to citizens above 10 years of age, all Serbian citizens over the age of 16 are legally obliged to carry their identity cards with them at all times and are subject to fines should they not. The identity card is a primary photo ID, Serbian passport and drivers license are used as valid photo IDs for various purposes.

== Appearance ==
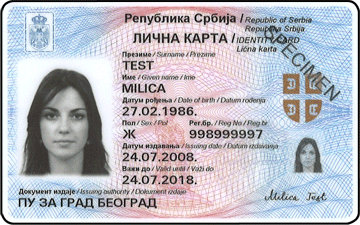

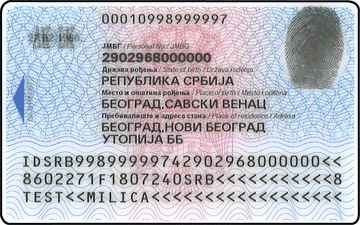
The front and back of the chip-less identity card

Serbian identity card has the same shape and size as many other national identity cards, as specified by the ISO/IEC 7810 standard. It features a light red and blue background, the national colours of Serbia. Obverse background has a picture of the Mother Serbia statue at the top of the building of the Government of Serbia in Belgrade, while the reverse has the lesser coat of arms.

In the chipped card, language used on the form is Serbian (in Cyrillic script) and English, however, personal data is printed only in Serbian Cyrillic. This has caused some controversy, since obviously national identity card will be difficult to use as a valid ID document abroad, except in those countries which also use Cyrillic script. Nevertheless, the chip-less version of the identity card uses Latin and Cyrillic scripts and has the holder's name printed in Latin script. This was done probably due to the fact that the name of the identity card holder is stored in Latin script inside the chip of a chipped card.

Serbian citizens who are members of a national minority have the option to have the form of their identity card printed in Serbian, English and their native language (or Serbian Latin), while personal data will be entered in native language (for example, for Serbian Hungarians, in Latin script Hungarian alphabet, instead of the Serbian Cyrillic). Citizens whose native language is Serbian can opt to have their name and surname entered in Serbian Latin, instead of Cyrillic script; however, ID card form will still be in Serbian Cyrillic and English only, as Serbian Latin and Serbian Cyrillic are not considered different languages.

Identity card includes the following data:

- Презиме / Surname
- Име / Given name
- Датум рођења / Date of birth
- Пол / Sex
- Рег. бр. / Reg No
- Датум издавања / Issuing date
- Важи до / Valid until
- Документ издаје / Issuing authority
- ЈМБГ / JMBG
- Држава рођења / State of birth
- Место и општина рођења / Place of birth
- Пребивалиште и адреса стана / Place of residence (not included on the biometric identity cards)

Bearers signature and fingerprint of the right index finger are also printed on the identity card.

Validity of the document is ten years (five for minors) from the date of handing in the application, while processing time is up to 15 days.

=== Machine readable zone ===
The MRZ is structured according to the ICAO standard for machine-readable ID cards.

The data of the machine readable zone consist of three lines of 30 characters each. The only characters used are those of Serbian Latin alphabet, except for letters with diacritics (ŠĐĆČŽ - they are replaced by the appropriate letter without a diacritical mark), 0-9 and the filler character <.

The format of the first row is:

Positions	Type	Meaning
1-2	alpha	ID, indicating an ID card
3-5	alpha	Issuing country (ISO 3166-1 alpha-3) code (SRB)
6–14	num	ID card registration number
15	num	check digit
16-28	num	Personal number (JMBG)

The format of the second row is:

Positions	Type	Meaning
1–6	num	Date of birth (YYMMDD)
7	num	check digit
8	alpha	gender (M-male; F - female)
9-14	num	Date of expiry (YYMMDD)
15	num	check digit
16-18	alpha	Nationality of bearer ISO 3166-1 alpha-3 code (SRB)
30	num	check digit

The format of the third row is:

Positions	Type	Meaning
1–30	alpha	Last name, followed by two filler characters, followed by given names

=== Chip ===
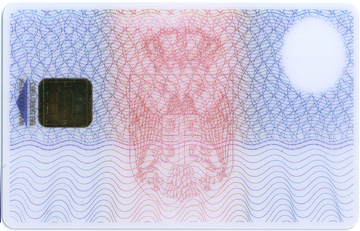
Blank identity card with a contact chip on the reverse side

After a long public debate, it has been decided that people will have an option to choose whether to have an identity card with or without the chip, containing the data already printed on the identity card. Those opting for the chip card do not have their place of residence (home address) printed, but it is stored in the chip. The police has provided the public with freeware software to download the data from any identity card to a computer (except for the scanned signature and the fingerprint) using a standard smart card reader. Serbian identity card does not feature contactless RFID chip, so it is not a fully ICAO9303 compliant biometric travel document. About two thirds of citizens applying for the identity card opt for the chipped version.

== Requirements ==
To acquire the identity card for the first time, a citizen must present a birth certificate and a proof of citizenship. In case of a renewal, only taxes should be paid and new photo will be taken at the police station.

== International travel ==
Serbian identity cards can be used instead of a passport for travel to some countries and territories in the Balkans that have signed special agreements with the government of Serbia.

Country/territory	Stay	Ref.
Albania	90 days	
Bosnia and Herzegovina	90 days	
Kosovo	90 days	
North Macedonia	90 days	
Montenegro	30 days	

== See also ==
- Serbian passport
- Serbian nationality law
- Visa policy of Serbia
- Visa requirements for Serbian citizens
- List of identity card policies by country
