= Visa requirements for Serbian citizens =

Administrative entry restrictions

Serbian passport

Visa requirements for Serbian citizens are administrative entry restrictions by the authorities of other states placed on citizens of the Republic of Serbia.

As of 2026, Serbian citizens had visa-free or visa on arrival access to 136 countries and territories, ranking the Serbian passport 35th in the world according to the Henley Passport Index. Serbia is one of a handful of countries whose citizens may travel visa-free to the Schengen Area, China and Russia.

== History ==
Until the 1990s, the Yugoslav passport has been described as highly sought-after commodity. As part of its non-aligned policies, the Yugoslav government signed numerous mutual agreements on visa-free entry from the mid-1960s.

Eventually this applied to most states of the world, promoting the Yugoslav passport to "one of the most convenient in the world, as it was one of the few with which a person could travel freely through both the East and West" during the Cold War.

With the subsequent dissolution of Yugoslavia in the 1990s, the period of difficulties related to travel bureaucracy started for all successor states. From the 2000s onward, the situation has been significantly and constantly improving and Serbian passport was among the five passports with the most improved rating in the Henley Passport Index since 2006, adding 103 countries to its visa-free list.

=== Recent period ===
Serbia and Russia signed visa-free travel agreement in 2009. Serbia signed a visa-free agreement with Israel in 2009. The European Union Schengen area countries lifted visas for Serbian citizens in 2009. Serbia and Turkey mutually abolished visa regime in 2010. Serbia signed an agreement on the abolishment of visas with Kazakhstan in 2010. Serbia and Ukraine mutually abolished visas in 2011. Japan abolished visas for Serbian citizens in 2011. Serbia and Albania mutually abolished visas in 2011. In 2013, agreement on visa-free travel with Brazil came into force. In 2014, agreement on visa-free travel with Mongolia came into force. In 2015, agreement on visa-free travel with Moldova came into force. In 2016, Indonesia abolished visas for Serbian citizens for a maximum stay of 30 days. In 2017, agreement on mutual visa free travel between China and Serbia entered into force. In 2017 Iran abolished visas for Serbian citizens but reversed its decision in 2018. Colombia abolished visas for Serbian citizens in February 2018. Serbia and Kyrgyzstan mutually abolished visas in 2018. Uzbekistan abolished visas for Serbian citizens in 2019. United Arab Emirates abolished visas for Serbian citizens in 2019. Barbados abolished visas for Serbian citizens in 2019. Suriname abolished visas for holders of Serbian passport in 2019. Armenia lifted visa requirements for Serbian citizens in 2020.

Holders of Serbian passports issued by the Coordination Directorate for Kosovo and Metohija have been exempt from visa requirements for the Schengen Area since 2024.

Since 2009, Serbia has been working towards expanding visa-free travel for its citizens. Serbia proposed inclusion in the United States Visa Waiver Program in 2009, but as of 2024, the adjusted visa refusal rate remains above the required 3% threshold. The United Kingdom initially discussed visa abolition in 2011, but in 2013, the UK Home Office stated it had no plans to remove visa requirements for Serbian citizens. Talks with Australia on facilitating visa issuance were held in 2012, while New Zealand introduced a facilitated visa regime for Serbian citizens in 2014. Discussions on visa liberalization with Canada began in 2016.

Serbian authorities have also held talks with several countries on concluding visa abolition agreements in the future including with Bahrain, Guatemala, Iran, Jamaica, Kuwait, Oman, Panama, Paraguay, South Africa, Tajikistan and Vietnam but have not yet concluded them.

== Visa requirements map ==
Visa requirements for Serbian citizens holding ordinary passports Serbia ID card valid Visa not required Visa available both on arrival or online Visa on arrival eVisa Visa required

== Visa requirements ==
Country	Visa requirement	Allowed stay	Notes (excluding departure fees)	Reciprocity
Afghanistan	eVisa	30 days	Visa is not required in case born in Afghanistan or can proof that one of their parents is a national of Afghanistan or born in Afghanistan.; e-Visa : Visitors must arrive at Kabul International (KBL).	✓
Albania	Visa not required	90 days	ID card valid.; 90 days within 180 days.	✓
Algeria	Visa required		Persons may be denied entry if entering with a passport containing visas or stamps issued by Israel.; Visitors on tours organized to some southern regions by an approved travel agency may obtain a visa on arrival for up to 30 days.	✓
Andorra	Visa not required			✓
Angola	eVisa	30 days	30 days per trip, but no more than 90 days within any 1 calendar year for tourism purposes only.; Visitors must have a return/onward ticket and a hotel reservation confirmation.; An International Certificate of Vaccination is required.	✓
Antigua and Barbuda	Visa not required	6 months		✓
Argentina	Visa not required	90 days		✓
Armenia	Visa not required	180 days		✓
Australia	Online visa required		Online Visitor e600 visa.	X
Austria	Visa not required	90 days	90 days within any 180 day period in the Schengen Area	✓
Azerbaijan	Visa not required	90 days	90 days within 180 days period.	✓
Bahamas	eVisa	3 months	Visa not required for permanent residents of the United States or Canada.; Cruise ship passengers travelling to and returning from the Bahamas do not require to obtain visa for entry. Both entry and departure must be by a cruise ship.	X
Bahrain	eVisa / Visa on arrival	14 days		X
Bangladesh	Visa on arrival	30 days	Not available at all entry points.	X
Barbados	Visa not required	90 days		✓
Belarus	Visa not required	30 days		✓
Belgium	Visa not required	90 days	90 days within any 180 day period in the Schengen Area.	✓
Belize	Visa required		Permanent residents of the US and Canada and holders of valid visas of the US, Canada, Schengen Area and the UK do not require a visa.	✓
Benin	eVisa	30 days	Must have an international vaccination certificate.; Three types of electronic visa are offered: the e-Visa valid for 30 days for a single entry (50 EUR), the e-Visa valid for 30 days for several (multiple) entries (75 EUR), and the e-Visa valid for 90 days to make several (multiple) entries (100 EUR).	X
Bhutan	eVisa	90 days	The Sustainable Development Fee (SDF) of 200 USD per person, per night for almost all visitors to Bhutan. Additionally, if payment is made in US dollars from September 1, 2023 to August 31, 2027, the SDF is 100 USD.	✓
Bolivia	Online Visa	30 days		X
Bosnia and Herzegovina	Visa not required	90 days	90 days within any 6-month period.; ID card valid.	✓
Botswana	eVisa	3 months	300 Botswana Pula for single entry for a period up to 3 months,500 Botswana Pula for multiple entry for a period up to 3 months,1500 Pula for multiple entry for a period over 3 months up to 2 years for dependants of residents.	x
Brazil	Visa not required	90 days		✓
Brunei	Visa required			✓
Bulgaria	Visa not required	90 days	90 days within any 180 day period in the Schengen Area.	✓
Burkina Faso	eVisa			✓
Burundi	Online Visa / Visa on arrival	1 month	Citizens of all countries that needed visas can now apply for a visa on arrival at Bujumbura International Airport, or at all land borders.	X
Cambodia	eVisa / Visa on arrival	30 days		X
Cameroon	eVisa			✓
Canada	Visa required		Visa not required for permanent residents of the United States.	X
Cape Verde	Visa on arrival	30 days	Not available at all entry points. Passengers who register with pre-registration (EASE), will not pay additional fee at arrival.	X
Central African Republic	Visa required			✓
Chad	eVisa		Passengers with an Entry Authorization letter issued by the authorities of Chad before departure can obtain a visa on arrival.	✓
Chile	Visa not required	90 days		✓
China	Visa not required	30 days	30 days within any 60 day period.	✓
Colombia	Visa not required	90 days		✓
Comoros	Visa on arrival	45 days		X
Republic of the Congo	Visa required		Passengers with a special entry authorization can obtain a visa on arrival. The entry authorization must be signed by the Minister of Interior and Decentralization and by the Director General of Territorial Surveillance. Also passengers with V.I.P. invitation letter are exempt from visa.	✓
Democratic Republic of the Congo	eVisa	7 days	Passengers with a letter (Visa Volant) issued by the Ministry of Interior and Security can obtain a visa on arrival for a maximum stay of 7 days. They can apply to extend their stay.	✓
Costa Rica	Visa not required	90 days		✓
Côte d'Ivoire	eVisa	3 months	e-Visa holders must arrive via Port Bouet Airport.	X
Croatia	Visa not required	90 days	90 days within any 180 day period in the Schengen Area.	✓
Cuba	eVisa	90 days		✓
Cyprus	Visa not required	90 days	90 days within any 180 day period.	✓
Czech Republic	Visa not required	90 days	90 days within any 180 day period in the Schengen Area.	✓
Denmark	Visa not required	90 days	90 days within any 180 day period in the Schengen Area.	✓
Djibouti	eVisa	90 days		X
Dominica	Visa not required	21 days		✓
Dominican Republic	Visa not required	90 days		X
Ecuador	Visa not required	90 days		X
Egypt	eVisa / Visa on arrival	30 days		✓
El Salvador	Visa required		Nationals of Serbia with a valid visa issued by Canada, the USA or a Schengen Member State are exempted from visa.	✓
Equatorial Guinea	eVisa		Must arrive via Malabo International Airport, processing fee USD 75	x
Eritrea	Visa required			✓
Estonia	Visa not required	90 days	90 days within any 180 day period in the Schengen Area.	✓
Eswatini	Visa not required	30 days		X
Ethiopia	eVisa / Visa on arrival	90 days	e-Visa holders must arrive via Addis Ababa Bole International Airport.	X
Fiji	Visa not required	4 months		X
Finland	Visa not required	90 days	90 days within any 180 day period in the Schengen Area.	✓
France	Visa not required	90 days	90 days within any 180 day period in the Schengen Area.	✓
Gabon	eVisa	90 days	e-Visa holders must arrive via Libreville International Airport. *Passengers with an entry authorization issued by immigration before departure can obtain a visa on arrival.	X
Gambia	Visa not required	90 days		✓
Georgia	Visa not required	1 year		✓
Germany	Visa not required	90 days	90 days within any 180 day period in the Schengen Area.	✓
Ghana	Visa required			✓
Greece	Visa not required	90 days	90 days within any 180 day period in the Schengen Area.	✓
Grenada	Visa not required	3 months		✓
Guatemala	Visa required		Not required for holders of a valid visa issued by Canada, the USA or a Schengen Member State.	✓
Guinea	eVisa	90 days		X
Guinea-Bissau	Visa on arrival	90 days		X
Guyana	eVisa			✓
Haiti	Visa not required	90 days		X
Honduras	Visa required		Not required for holders of a valid visa issued by Canada, the USA or a Schengen Member State.	✓
Hungary	Visa not required	90 days	90 days within any 180 day period in the Schengen Area.	✓
Iceland	Visa not required	90 days	90 days within any 180 day period in the Schengen Area.	✓
India	eVisa	30 days	e-Visa holders must arrive via 32 designated airports (Note: Ahmedabad; Amritsar; Bagdogra; Bengaluru; Bhubaneswar; Chandigarh; Chennai; Coimbatore; Delhi; Gaya; Goa-Dabolim; Goa-Manohar; Guwahati; Hyderabad; Indore; Jaipur; Kannur; Kochi; Kolkata; Kozhikode; Lucknow; Madurai; Mangaluru; Mumbai; Nagpur; Port Blair; Pune; Surat; Thiruvananthapuram; Tiruchirappalli; Varanasi; Visakhapatnam) or 5 designated seaports. (Note: Chennai; Cochin; Mormugao (Goa); Mumbai; Mangalore); An Indian e-Tourist Visa may only be obtained twice within 1 calendar year.; Foreigners of Pakistani origin or who hold a Pakistani Passport are not eligible for an e-Visa. Foreigners who are not Pakistani nationals, but whose parents or grandparents (either paternal or maternal) were born in, or were permanent residents in Pakistan, are also not eligible for an e-Visa.	X
Indonesia	e-VOA / Visa on arrival	30 days		X
Iran	Visa not required	15 days		X
Iraq	eVisa	30 days		X
Ireland	Visa required		Visa is issued free of charge.; Visa waiver for UK 'C' visa holders. Entry permitted only if first point of entry to the Common Travel Area is in the UK.	X
Israel	Electronic Travel Authorization	3 months		✓
Italy	Visa not required	90 days	90 days within any 180 day period in the Schengen Area.	✓
Jamaica	Visa on arrival	30 days		X
Japan	Visa not required	90 days	Visa not required for visits up to 90 days using the Serbian biometric passports according of Here.	✓
Jordan	eVisa / Visa on arrival	30 days	Visa can be obtained upon arrival, it will cost a total of 40 JOD, obtainable at most international ports of entry and land border crossings. (except King Hussein/Allenby Bridge)	X
Kazakhstan	Visa not required	30 days		✓
Kenya	Electronic Travel Authorisation	90 days	Applications can be submitted up to 90 days prior to travel and must be submitted at least 3 days in advance.; eTA fee is 32.50 USD.; Proof of reservation at the hotel where visitors plan to stay is required (if staying with friends, an invitation letter is also acceptable).; Yellow fever vaccination certificate is required if coming from endemic countries.	✓
Kiribati	Visa required			✓
North Korea	Visa required			✓
South Korea	Electronic Travel Authorization	90 days	The validity period of a K-ETA is 3 years from the date of approval.	✓
Kuwait	eVisa / Visa on arrival	3 months		✓
Kyrgyzstan	Visa not required	90 days	90 days within 180 days.	✓
Laos	eVisa / Visa on arrival	30 days	18 (Note: Savannakhet Airport; Lanetoui - Mengkang (China); Meuangmom - Wan Pong (Myanmar); Banvang - Ban Khok Phai (Thailand); Namngeun - Huay Kon (Thailand); Paksan - Bueng Kan (Thailand); Paktaphan - Pak Saeng (Thailand); Pangmon - Ban Huak (Thailand); Phoudou (Thailand); Dak ta ock - Nam Giang (Vietnam); La Lai (Vietnam); Namkan (Vietnam); Namphao - Cau Treo (Vietnam); Namsoy - Na Meo (Vietnam); Naphao - Cha Lo (Vietnam); Pahang - Long Sap (Vietnam); Panghok - Tây Trang (Vietnam); Phoukeua - Bo Y (Vietnam)) of the 33 border crossings are only open to regular visa holders.; e-Visa may be used to enter Laos through the Luang Prabang, Pakse and Vientiane international airports, 3 Thai-Lao Friendship Bridges (Note: Vientiane (Friendship Bridge 1); Savannakhet (Friendship Bridge 2); Bokeo (Friendship Bridge 4)), in Boten (road and railroad), and in Vientiane (at Khamsavath railway station).; Visa on arrival is available at the Luang Prabang, Pakse and Vientiane international airports, 4 Thai-Lao Friendship Bridges (Note: Vientiane (Friendship Bridge 1); Savannakhet (Friendship Bridge 2); Khammouane (Friendship Bridge 3); Bokeo (Friendship Bridge 4)) and 7 border crossings. (Note: Nongnokkheane - Trapeang Kriel (Cambodia); Boten - Bo han (China); Golden Triangle/Samliemkham (Thailand); Khamsavath railway station (Thailand); Namheuang - Ban Na Kraseng (Thailand); Vang tao - Chongmek (Thailand); Dansavan - Lao Bảo (Vietnam))	X
Latvia	Visa not required	90 days	90 days within any 180 day period in the Schengen Area.	✓
Lebanon	Free visa on arrival	1 month	Extendable for 2 additional months.; Granted free of charge at Beirut International Airport or any other port of entry if there is no Israeli visa or seal, holding a telephone number, an address in Lebanon, and a non refundable return or circle trip ticket.	X
Lesotho	Visa required			✓
Liberia	e-VOA	3 months		✓
Libya	eVisa	30 days		x
Liechtenstein	Visa not required	90 days	90 days within any 180 day period in the Schengen Area.	✓
Lithuania	Visa not required	90 days	90 days within any 180 day period in the Schengen Area.	✓
Luxembourg	Visa not required	90 days	90 days within any 180 day period in the Schengen Area.	✓
Madagascar	eVisa / Visa on arrival	90 days	For stays of 61 to 90 days, the visa fee is 59 USD.	X
Malawi	eVisa	30 days		X
Malaysia	eVisa	30 days		X
Maldives	Free Visa on arrival	30 days		X
Mali	Visa required			✓
Malta	Visa not required	90 days	90 days within any 180 day period in the Schengen Area.	✓
Marshall Islands	Visa required			X
Mauritania	eVisa	30 days		✓
Mauritius	Visa on arrival	60 days		X
Mexico	Visa required		Visa not required for holders of valid visa issued by the US, Canada, Japan, the UK, or any of the countries comprising the Schengen Area, or for holders of valid permanent resident card from Canada, Chile, Colombia, Japan, Peru, the US, the UK or any of the countries comprising the Schengen Area.; Visa is also issued free of charge for Serbian citizens.	X
Micronesia	Visa not required	30 days		X
Moldova	Visa not required	90 days	90 days within any 180 day period.	✓
Monaco	Visa not required			✓
Mongolia	Visa required			✓
Montenegro	Visa not required	3 months	ID card valid for 30 days.	✓
Morocco	Visa required			✓
Mozambique	eVisa / Visa on arrival	30 days		X
Myanmar	eVisa	28 days	e-Visa holders must arrive via Yangon, Nay Pyi Taw or Mandalay airports or via land border crossings with Thailand – Tachileik, Myawaddy and Kawthaung or India – Rih Khaw Dar and Tamu.; e-Visa is available for tourism only.	X
Namibia	eVisa	3 months		✓
Nauru	Visa required			✓
Nepal	Online Visa / Visa on arrival	90 days		X
Netherlands	Visa not required	90 days	90 days within any 180 day period in the Schengen Area.	✓
New Zealand	Visa required		Collective passports issued by the former Federal Republic of Yugoslavia are unacceptable, and visas will not be endorsed in them.; Holders of an Australian Permanent Resident Visa or Resident Return Visa may be granted a New Zealand Resident Visa on arrival permitting indefinite stay (pursuant to the Trans-Tasman Travel Arrangement), subject to meeting character requirements and obtaining an Electronic Travel Authority prior to departure.	X
Nicaragua	Visa on arrival	90 days	Not required for holders of a valid visa issued by Canada, the USA or a Schengen Member State.	X
Niger	Visa required			✓
Nigeria	eVisa	30 days		✓
North Macedonia	Visa not required	90 days	ID card valid.; 90 days within 180 days.	✓
Norway	Visa not required	90 days	90 days within any 180 day period in the Schengen Area.	✓
Oman	Visa not required / eVisa	14 days / 30 days		X
Pakistan	eVisa	3 months		X
Palau	Free visa on arrival	30 days		X
Panama	Visa not required	90 days		X
Papua New Guinea	eVisa	60 days	Visitors may apply for a visa online under the "Tourist - Own Itinerary" category.	✓
Paraguay	Visa required			X
Peru	Visa not required	90 days	90 days in 180 days period.	✓
Philippines	Visa required		Residents of the United Arab Emirates may obtain an eVisa through the official Philippine eVisa website. A valid Emirati residence visa must be shown upon an eVisa application.	✓
Poland	Visa not required	90 days	90 days within any 180 day period in the Schengen Area.	✓
Portugal	Visa not required	90 days	90 days within any 180 day period in the Schengen Area.	✓
Qatar	eVisa			✓
Romania	Visa not required	90 days	90 days within any 180 day period in the Schengen Area.	✓
Russia	Visa not required	30 days	For a maximum total stay of 90 days within one calendar year period.	✓
Rwanda	eVisa / Visa on arrival	30 days		X
Saint Kitts and Nevis	Visa not required	90 days		X
Saint Lucia	Visa not required	6 weeks		✓
Saint Vincent and the Grenadines	Visa not required	3 months		✓
Samoa	Entry permit on arrival	90 days		X
San Marino	Visa not required			✓
São Tomé and Príncipe	eVisa			X
Saudi Arabia	eVisa / Visa on arrival		Holders of a US, UK or Schengen visas have been eligible for a Saudi e-Visa upon arrival.	X
Senegal	Visa on arrival	1 month		X
Seychelles	Electronic Border System	3 months	Application can be submitted up to 30 days before travel.; Visitors must upload a reservation confirmation(s) for each visitor's location of stay in Seychelles.; Yellow fever vaccination certificate is required if coming from endemic countries.; Payment of the fee (EUR 10) by credit or debit card.; Valid for one journey only and it expires once exit the country.	✓
Sierra Leone	eVisa	3 months		✓
Singapore	Visa not required	30 days		✓
Slovakia	Visa not required	90 days	90 days within any 180 day period in the Schengen Area.	✓
Slovenia	Visa not required	90 days	90 days within any 180 day period in the Schengen Area.	✓
Solomon Islands	Visa required			✓
Somalia	eVisa	30 days		✓
South Africa	Visa required			✓
South Sudan	eVisa		Obtainable online 30 days single entry for 100 USD, 90 days multiple entry for 200 USD and 180 days multiple entry for 350 USD.; Printed visa authorization must be presented at the time of travel.	X
Spain	Visa not required	90 days	90 days within any 180 day period in the Schengen Area.	✓
Sri Lanka	ETA / Visa on arrival	30 days		X
Sudan	Visa required			✓
Suriname	Visa not required	30 days	An entrance fee of USD 50 or EUR 50 must be paid online prior to arrival.; Multiple entry e-Visa is also available.	✓
Sweden	Visa not required	90 days	90 days within any 180 day period in the Schengen Area.	✓
Switzerland	Visa not required	90 days	90 days within any 180 day period in the Schengen Area.	✓
Syria	eVisa			X
Tajikistan	Visa not required /eVisa	30 days / 60 days	Visa also available online.	X
Tanzania	eVisa / Visa on arrival	90 days		X
Thailand	eVisa / Visa on arrival	60 days / 15 days		X
Timor-Leste	Visa on arrival	30 days	Not available at all entry points.	X
Togo	eVisa	15 days		X
Tonga	Visa required			✓
Trinidad and Tobago	Visa not required	30 days		✓
Tunisia	Visa on arrival (conditional)		Travelers traveling as a group may obtain a visa on arrival.	✓
Turkey	Visa not required	90 days	90 days within any 180-day period.	✓
Turkmenistan	Visa required		10-day visa on arrival if holding a letter of invitation provided by a company registered in Turkmenistan with a prior approval from the Foreign Ministry. Visitors can apply to extend their stay for an additional 10 days.; When transiting between two non-bordering countries, visitors can obtain a Turkmenistan transit visa for a five-day stay. This must be applied for in advance at the Turkmenistan Embassy. Visitors must also submit copies of the visas for the country of entry into Turkmenistan and the country of departure from Turkmenistan. Visa fee is 20 USD.	✓
Tuvalu	Visa not required	90 days	90 days within 180 days.	X
Uganda	eVisa	3 months	Determined at the port of entry.	X
Ukraine	Visa not required	90 days	90 days within 180 days.	✓
United Arab Emirates	Visa not required	90 days		✓
United Kingdom	Visa required		Serbian citizens who hold a valid entry visa for Australia, Canada, New Zealand or the United States, and a valid airline ticket for travel via the United Kingdom, as part of a journey to or from one of those countries and/or are permanent residents of the European Union, Australia, Canada and New Zealand do not require a Direct Airside Transit visa.	X
United States	Visa required			X
Uruguay	Visa not required	90 days		✓
Uzbekistan	Visa not required	30 days		X
Vanuatu	Visa not required	120 days		X
Vatican City	Visa not required			X
Venezuela	Visa not required	90 days	On July 14, 2023, a visa waiver agreement was signed between the two countries, and both national parliaments ratified it in 2023 and 2025.	✓
Vietnam	eVisa	90 days	30 days visa free when visit Phu Quoc Island.	X
Yemen	Visa required		Yemen introduced an e-Visa system for visitors who meet certain eligibility requirements (group travel of 10 or more people, business trips, and transit etc.).	✓
Zambia	Visa not required	90 days		X
Zimbabwe	eVisa / Visa on arrival	1 month		X

=== Territories and disputed areas ===
Visa requirements for Serbian citizens for visits to various territories, disputed areas, partially recognised countries and restricted zones:

Visitor to	Visa requirement	Notes (excluding departure fees)		
Europe
Abkhazia	Visa required	Tourists from all countries (except Georgia) can visit Abkhazia for a period not exceeding 24 hours as part of an organized tourist group.		
Mount Athos	Special permit required	Special permit required (4 days: 25 euro for Orthodox visitors, 35 euro for non-Orthodox visitors, 18 euro for students). There is a visitors' quota: maximum 100 Orthodox and 10 non-Orthodox per day and women are not allowed.		
(Autonomous Republic of Crimea) Crimea	Visa not required	Territory accessed under Russian visa policy.		
(United Nations) UN Buffer Zone in Cyprus	Access Permit required	Access Permit is required for travelling inside the zone, except Civil Use Areas.		
Faroe Islands	Visa not required	90 days		
Gibraltar	Visa not required	90 days	90 days within any 180 day period in the Schengen Area.	✓
Guernsey	Visa required			
Isle of Man	Visa required			
Kosovo	Visa not required	90 days; ID card valid only, entry with passport refused. Registration required at the nearest police station within 72 hours of entering this disputed territory.		
(Norway) Jan Mayen	Permit required	Permit issued by the local police required for staying for less than 24 hours. and permit issued by the Norwegian police for staying for more than 24 hours.		
Jersey	Visa required			
Russia	Special authorization required	Several closed cities and regions in Russia require special authorization.		
South Ossetia	Visa required	To enter South Ossetia, visitors must have a multiple-entry visa for Russia and register their stay with the Migration Service of the Ministry of Internal Affairs within 3 days.		
Transnistria	Visa not required	Visitors must complete and obtain a temporary migration card at the border checkpoint. The maximum period of stay is 45 days, and it can be extended multiple times through this card.		
Turkish Republic of Northern Cyprus	Visa not required	90 days		
Africa
Ascension Island	eVisa	3 months within any year period.		
British Indian Ocean Territory	Special permit required	Special permit required.		
Eritrea outside Asmara	Travel permit required	To travel in the rest of the country, a Travel Permit for Foreigners is required (20 Eritrean nakfa).		
Mayotte	Visa not required	90 days		
Réunion	Visa not required	90 days		
Sahrawi Arab Democratic Republic	Visa regime undefined	Undefined visa regime in the Western Sahara controlled territory.		
Saint Helena	eVisa			
Somaliland	Visa required			
Sudan	Travel permit required	All foreigners traveling more than 25 kilometers outside of Khartoum must obtain a travel permit.		
(Sudan) Darfur	Travel permit required	Separate travel permit is required.		
Tristan da Cunha	Permission required	Permission to land required for 15/30 pounds sterling (yacht/ship passenger) for Tristan da Cunha Island or 20 pounds sterling for Gough Island, Inaccessible Island or Nightingale Islands.		
Asia
(Tajikistan) Gorno-Badakhshan Autonomous Province	OIVR permit required	OIVR permit required (15+5 Tajikistani Somoni) and another special permit (free of charge) is required for Lake Sarez.		
Hong Kong	Visa not required	14 days; Only the passport with biometric cover.		
India PAP/RAP	PAP/RAP required	Protected Area Permit (PAP) required for whole states of Nagaland and Sikkim and parts of states Manipur, Arunachal Pradesh, Uttaranchal, Jammu and Kashmir, Rajasthan, Himachal Pradesh. Restricted Area Permit (RAP) required for all of Andaman and Nicobar Islands and parts of Sikkim. Some of these requirements are occasionally lifted for a year.		
Kazakhstan	Special permission required	Special permission required for the town of Baikonur and surrounding areas in Kyzylorda Oblast, and the town of Gvardeyskiy near Almaty.		
(Iran) Kish Island	Visa not required	14 days; Visitors to Kish Island do not require a visa.		
Iraqi Kurdistan	Visa required	Before applying for a visa, applicants must complete the application form to obtain a sponsor code and then provide this code to a sponsor in Kurdistan.; Once the sponsor code is provided, the sponsor applies for the e-Visa, pays the fee, and notifies the applicant of the application results.; Visa exempt for those who were born in Iraq.; e-Visa for 30 days is available at Erbil and Sulaymaniyah airports.		
Macao	Visa not required	90 days		
Maldives	Permission required	With the exception of the capital Malé, tourists are generally prohibited from visiting non-resort islands without the express permission of the Government of Maldives.		
North Korea outside Pyongyang	Special permit required	People are not allowed to leave the capital city, tourists can only leave the capital with a governmental tourist guide (no independent moving)		
Palestine	Visa not required	Arrival by sea to Gaza Strip not allowed.		
Taiwan	Visa required			
(China) Tibet Autonomous Region	TTP required	Tibet Travel Permit required (10 USD).		
Turkmenistan	Special permit required	A special permit, issued prior to arrival by Ministry of Foreign Affairs, is required if visiting the following places: Atamurat, Cheleken, Dashoguz, Serakhs and Serhetabat.		
(United Nations) Korean Demilitarized Zone	Restricted zone.			
(United Nations) UNDOF Zone and Ghajar	Restricted zone.			
(Vietnam) Phú Quốc	Visa not required	30 days		
Yemen	Special permission required	Special permission needed for travel outside Sanaa or Aden.		
Americas
Anguilla	eVisa			
Aruba	Visa not required	30 days		
Bermuda	Visa required			
(Netherlands) Bonaire, St. Eustatius and Saba	Visa not required	90 days		
British Virgin Islands	Visa required			
Cayman Islands	Visa required	Transit visa required.		
Curaçao	Visa not required	90 days		
French Guiana	Visa not required	90 days		
(France) French West Indies	Visa not required	90 days; includes overseas departments of Guadeloupe and Martinique and overseas collectivities of Saint Martin and Saint Barthélemy		
Greenland	Visa not required	90 days		
Montserrat	eVisa			
Puerto Rico	Visa required			
Saint Pierre and Miquelon	Visa not required	90 days		
Sint Maarten	Visa not required	90 days		
Turks and Caicos Islands	Visa required			
U.S. Virgin Islands	Visa required			
Oceania
American Samoa	Visa required			
(Australia) Ashmore and Cartier Islands	Special authorisation required	Special authorisation required.		
(France) Clipperton Island	Special permit required	Special permit required.		
Cook Islands	Visa not required	31 days		
(Fiji) Lau Province	Special permission required	Special permission required.		
French Polynesia	Visa not required	90 days		
Guam	Visa required			
New Caledonia	Visa not required	90 days		
Niue	Visa not required	30 days		
Northern Mariana Islands	Visa required			
Pitcairn Islands	Visa not required	14 days visa-free and landing fee USD 35 or tax of USD 5 if not going ashore.		
Tokelau	Entry permit required			
United States Minor Outlying Islands	Special permits required	Special permits required for Baker Island, Howland Island, Jarvis Island, Johnston Atoll, Kingman Reef, Midway Atoll, Palmyra Atoll and Wake Island.		
Wallis and Futuna	Visa not required	90 days		
South America
Galápagos	Pre-registration required	60 days; Visitors must pre-register to receive a 20 USD Transit Control Card (TCT).		
South Atlantic and Antarctica
Falkland Islands	Visa required			
South Georgia and the South Sandwich Islands	Permit required	Pre-arrival permit from the Commissioner required (72 hours/1 month for 110/160 pounds sterling).		
Antarctica	Special Permits Required	Special permits required for British Antarctic Territory, French Southern and Antarctic Lands, Argentine Antarctica, (Australia) Australian Antarctic Territory, (Antártica Chilena Province) Chilean Antarctic Territory, (Australia) Heard Island and McDonald Islands, (Norway) Peter I Island, (Norway) Queen Maud Land, (New Zealand) Ross Dependency.		

== Diplomatic and official passports ==
Countries	Stay
Azerbaijan	90 days
Bangladesh	30 days
Bolivia	90 days
China	90 days
El Salvador	90 days
Ethiopia	90 days
Guatemala	90 days
Honduras	90 days
India	90 days
Iran	90 days
Jordan	90 days
Kyrgyzstan	90 days
Laos	90 days
Lebanon	90 days
North Korea	90 days
Mali	30 days
Mexico	180 days
Morocco	90 days
Kuwait	90 days
Nicaragua	90 days
Pakistan	30 days
Russia	90 days
Thailand	90 days
Ukraine	90 days
United Arab Emirates	90 days
Vietnam	90 days
Zimbabwe	90 days

== Serbian identity card as optional passport replacement ==
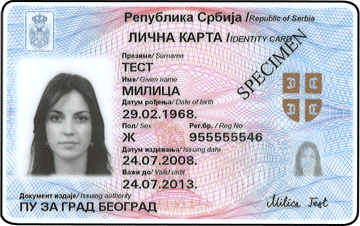
Serbian identity card

Serbian identity cards can be used instead of a passport for travel to some Balkan countries and territories that have signed bilateral agreements with Serbia.

Countries and territories	Stay
Albania	90 days
Bosnia and Herzegovina	90 days
Kosovo	90 days
Montenegro	30 days
North Macedonia	90 days

== Non-visa restrictions ==
=== Blank passport pages ===
Many countries require a minimum number of blank pages to be available in the passport being presented, typically one or two pages. Endorsement pages, which often appear after the visa pages, are not counted as being valid or available.

=== Vaccination ===
Cover of the new International Certificate of Vaccination issued by the Bureau of Quarantine in the Philippines since 2021

The African countries of Angola, Benin, Burkina Faso, Burundi, Cameroon, Central African Republic, Democratic Republic of the Congo, Republic of the Congo, Côte d'Ivoire, Gabon, Ghana, Guinea-Bissau, Mali, Niger, Sierra Leone and Togo, South Sudan and Uganda, along with French Guiana in South America, require all incoming passengers older than nine months to one year, to have a current International Certificate of Vaccination or Prophylaxis.

Some other countries require vaccination only if the passenger is coming from an infected area or has visited one recently or has transited for 12 hours in those countries: Algeria, Botswana, Cabo Verde, Chad, Djibouti, Egypt, Eswatini, Ethiopia, Gambia, Ghana, Guinea, Lesotho, Libya, Equatorial Guinea, Eritrea, Madagascar, Malawi, Mauritania, Mauritius, Mozambique, Namibia, Nigeria, Papua New Guinea, Seychelles, Somalia, South Africa, Sudan, Tunisia, Uganda, Tanzania, Zambia and Zimbabwe.

=== Passport validity length ===
Very few countries, such as Paraguay, just require a valid passport on arrival.

However many countries and groupings now require only an identity card – especially from their neighbours. Other countries may have special bilateral arrangements that depart from the generality of their passport validity length policies to shorten the period of passport validity required for each other's citizens or even accept passports that have already expired (but not been cancelled).

Some countries, such as Japan, Ireland and the United Kingdom, require a passport valid throughout the period of the intended stay.

In the absence of specific bilateral agreements, countries requiring passports to be valid for at least 6 more months on arrival include Afghanistan, Algeria, Anguilla, Bahrain, Bhutan, Botswana, British Virgin Islands, Brunei, Cambodia, Cameroon, Cape Verde, Cayman Islands, Central African Republic, Chad, Comoros, Costa Rica, Côte d'Ivoire, Curaçao, Ecuador, Egypt, El Salvador, Equatorial Guinea, Fiji, Gabon, Guinea Bissau, Guyana, Haiti, India, Indonesia, Iran, Iraq, Israel, Jordan, Kenya, Kiribati, Kuwait, Laos, Madagascar, Malaysia, Marshall Islands, Mongolia, Myanmar, Namibia, Nepal, Nicaragua, Nigeria, Oman, Palau, Papua New Guinea, Peru, Philippines, Qatar, Rwanda, Samoa, Saudi Arabia, Singapore, Solomon Islands, Somalia, Sri Lanka, Sudan, Suriname, Tanzania, Thailand, Timor-Leste, Tokelau, Tonga, Turkey, Tuvalu, Uganda, United Arab Emirates, Vanuatu, Venezuela, and Vietnam.

Countries requiring passports valid for at least 4 months on arrival include Micronesia and Zambia.

Countries requiring passports with a validity of at least 3 months beyond the date of intended departure include Azerbaijan, Bosnia and Herzegovina, Honduras, Montenegro, Nauru, Moldova and New Zealand. Similarly, the EEA countries of Iceland, Liechtenstein, Norway, all European Union countries (except Ireland) together with Switzerland also require 3 months validity beyond the date of the bearer's intended departure unless the bearer is an EEA or Swiss national.

Countries requiring passports valid for at least 3 months on arrival include Albania, North Macedonia, Panama, and Senegal.

Bermuda requires passports to be valid for at least 45 days upon entry.

Countries that require a passport validity of at least one month beyond the date of intended departure include Eritrea, Hong Kong, Lebanon, Macau, the Maldives and South Africa.

==== Maximum passport age ====
Countries of the Schengen area require non-EU passports to be less than 10 years old upon entry.

=== Criminal record ===
Some countries, including Australia, Canada, Fiji, New Zealand and the United States, routinely deny entry to non-citizens who have a criminal record, while others impose restrictions depending on the type of conviction and the length of the sentence.

=== Persona non grata ===
The government of a country can declare a diplomat persona non grata, banning them from entering the country or expelling them if they have already entered. In non-diplomatic use, the authorities of a country may also declare a foreigner persona non grata permanently or temporarily, usually because of unlawful activity.

=== Israeli stamps ===
Kuwait, Lebanon, Libya, and Yemen do not allow entry to people with passport stamps from Israel or whose passports have either a used or an unused Israeli visa, or where there is evidence of previous travel to Israel such as entry or exit stamps from neighbouring border posts in transit countries such as Jordan and Egypt.

To circumvent this Arab League boycott of Israel, the Israeli immigration services have now mostly ceased to stamp foreign nationals' passports on either entry to or exit from Israel (unless the entry is for some work-related purposes). Since 15 January 2013, Israel no longer stamps foreign passports at Ben Gurion Airport. Passports are still (as of 22 June 2017) stamped at Erez when passing into and out of Gaza.

Iran refuses admission to holders of passports containing an Israeli visa or stamp that is less than 12 months old.

=== Biometrics ===
Several countries mandate that all travellers, or all foreign travellers, be fingerprinted on arrival and will refuse admission to or even arrest travellers who refuse to comply. In some countries, such as the United States, this may apply even to transit passengers who merely wish to change planes rather than go landside.

Fingerprinting countries/regions include Afghanistan, Argentina, Brunei, Cambodia, China, Ethiopia, Ghana, Guinea, India, Japan, Kenya (both fingerprints and a photo are taken), Malaysia upon entry and departure, Mongolia, Saudi Arabia, the Schengen Area, Singapore, South Korea, Taiwan, Thailand, Uganda, the United Arab Emirates and the United States.

Many countries also require a photo be taken of people entering the country. The United States, which does not fully implement exit control formalities at its land frontiers (although long mandated by its own legislation), intends to implement facial recognition for passengers departing from international airports to identify people who overstay their visa.

Together with fingerprint and face recognition, iris scanning is one of three biometric identification technologies internationally standardised since 2006 by the International Civil Aviation Organization (ICAO) for use in e-passports and the United Arab Emirates conducts iris scanning on visitors who need to apply for a visa. The United States Department of Homeland Security has announced plans to greatly increase the biometric data it collects at US borders. In 2018, Singapore began trials of iris scanning at three land and maritime immigration checkpoints.

== See also ==
- Visa policy of Serbia
- Serbian nationality law
- Serbian passport
- List of passports
