= Serbian passport =

Travel document issued to citizens of the Republic of Serbia

- The front cover of a pre-July 2026 Serbian biometric passport

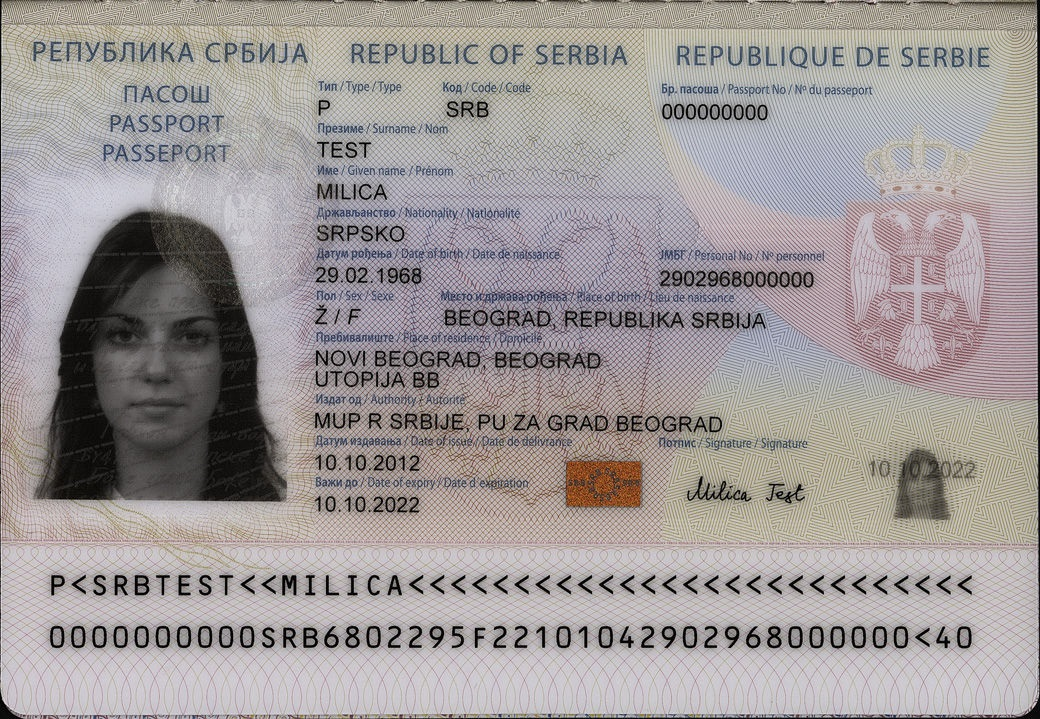
- The data page of a contemporary Serbian biometric passport
- Type: Passport
- Issued by: Ministry of Internal Affairs (through the Serbian Police)
- First issued: 7 July 2008 (biometric passport); 13 May 2016 (current version)
- Purpose: Identification
- Valid in: All countries and territories
- Eligibility: Serbian citizenship
- Expiration: 10 years (age 18 and older); 5 years (age 3–14); 3 years (under age of 3)
- Cost: 4,500 RSD/~38€

A Serbian passport (Serbian: Пасош Србије, romanized: Pasoš Srbije) is the primary document of international travel issued to nationals of Serbia. Passports are issued and renewed by the Serbian Police on behalf of the Ministry of Internal Affairs or, if the citizen resides abroad, by the Serbian diplomatic missions. Besides serving as proof of identity and of citizenship, it facilitates the process of securing assistance from Serbian consular officials abroad, if needed.

The Serbian biometric passports were introduced on 7 July 2008 and were handed out in the beginning of August in the same year. All outdated Yugoslav passports became invalid on 31 December 2011. In April 2026 passport received a redesign, including from maroon to burgundy for the cover. Citizens cannot have multiple Serbian passports at the same time.

== Appearance ==
=== Cover ===
Serbian passports have a burgundy cover, in line with the EU standard, and have inscriptions in golden letters in two languages - Serbian (Cyrillic) and English: РЕПУБЛИКА СРБИЈА and REPUBLIC OF SERBIA at the top, and ПАСОШ and PASSPORT at the bottom divided by the Serbian lesser coat of arms. The biometric passport symbol alerting to the presence of a RFID chip inside the document, is at the very bottom of the cover page. The inside cover is dominated by brownish-red, blue-gray, ocker, and gray-olive tones it contains a red stylized cross with four fire steels, as well as mini and microtext "REPUBLIKA SRBIJA" (Serbian Latin) printed in three colours (black, blue, and red) in both Cyrillic and Latin scripts. The security thread incorporates UV and IR protection. Under UV light, it fluoresces blue and red. The watermark motif is the White Angel. The inside back cover contains information on consular assistance in Serbian, English and French.

=== Data page ===
The Serbian passport includes the following data:

- Type (‘P’ - Passport)
- Code for issuing country ("SRB" - Serbia)
- Passport serial number
- Name of bearer
- Nationality ("Republike Srbije" - Republic of Serbia)
- Date of birth (DD.MM.YYYY)
- National identity number ("JMBG")
- Sex
- Place of birth
- Place of residence
- Issuing office
- Date of issue (DD.MM.YYYY)
- Date of expiry (DD.MM.YYYY)
- Signature and photo of bearer

The data page also contains the RFID chip and is printed in the Serbian Cyrillic script, English and French, while the personal data is entered in the Serbian Latin script.

=== Visa and border stamp pages ===
The passport contains further 32 pages suitable for visas and border stamps. They feature a range of light colours, predominantly red, green, yellow and blue, and have the Serbian lesser coat of arms in the centre. They are perforated with the passport's serial number on the bottom, and have watermarks with page numbers.

== Types ==
There are three types of passport:

- Regular passport is issued to all citizens.

- Validity is determined by the age of the holder: 10 years for adults, 5 years if issued to a person between 3 and 14 years of age and 3 years for person under 3 years old.
- Maximum processing time is 30 days for regular applications (60 days at diplomatic-consular missions), and 48 hours for urgent applications. Fee is RSD 4,500.

- Diplomatic passport is issued by the Ministry of Foreign Affairs to diplomats, high-ranking officials, members of the parliament and persons travelling on official state business, as well as to immediate family members of the above.

- Validity is determined by the nature of the position held - diplomats and officials will usually receive the passport covering their mandate in office.

- Official passport is identical in all aspects to the diplomatic passport, but lacks the privileges of diplomatic immunity. It is issued to mid and low-ranking officials, as well as to non-diplomatic staff at the embassies and consulates.

In case of loss of a passport abroad, an emergency travel document is issued by the consulate, which is used by citizens of Serbia to return to country. A seaman's book is also considered a travel document.

== Visa requirements ==
Visa requirements for Serbian citizens Serbia Visa not required Visa on arrival eVisa Visa available both on arrival or online Visa required prior to arrival

As of 2025, Serbian citizens have visa-free or visa on arrival access to 138 countries and territories, ranking the Serbian passport 34th overall in terms of travel freedom according to the Henley Passport Index and among the five passports with the most improved rating since 2006.

== International travel using Serbian identity card ==
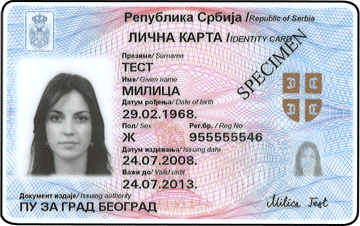
Serbian identity card

Serbian identity cards can be used instead of a passport for travel to some countries and territories in the Balkans that have signed special agreements with the government of Serbia.

Country/territory	Stay	Ref.
Albania	90 days	
Bosnia and Herzegovina	90 days	
Kosovo	90 days	
North Macedonia	90 days	
Montenegro	30 days	

== Residents of Kosovo ==
Under Serbian law, people born in Kosovo or legally residing are by law considered Serbian nationals and as such they are entitled to a Serbian passport. However, these passports are not issued by the Directorate of the Administrative Affairs of the Serbian Police but by the Coordination Directorate for Kosovo and Metohija of the Serbian Ministry of Internal Affairs. Bearers of these passports used to require a Schengen visa for travel to the Schengen Area since they were not covered by the Annex II list of countries allowed visa free entry to the Schengen Area. In 2024, the European Parliament adopted a resolution that exempts visa requirements for Serbian citizens with passports issued by Coordination Directorate for Kosovo and Metohija, finally putting an end to Schengen visa requirements for all citizens of the Western Balkans.

== Gallery ==
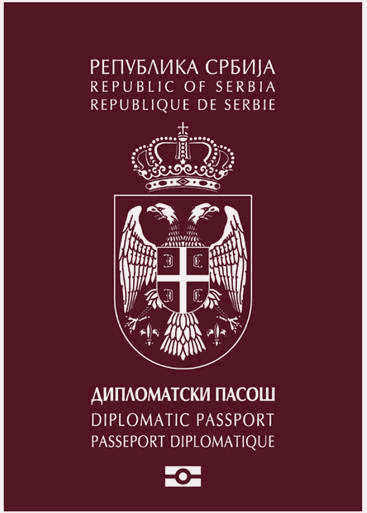
Diplomatic passport

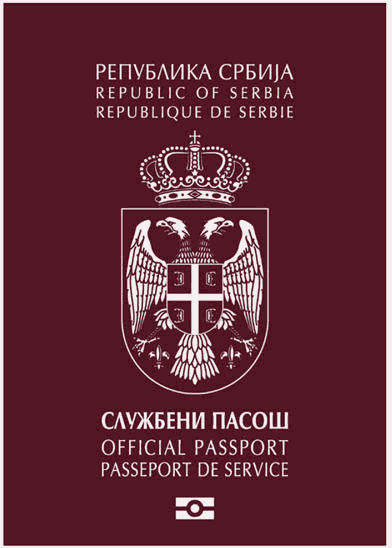
Official passport

== See also ==
- Serbian identity card
- Serbian nationality law
- Visa policy of Serbia
- Visa requirements for Serbian citizens
