= Yugoslav passport =

Passport of Yugoslavia issued to Yugoslav citizens

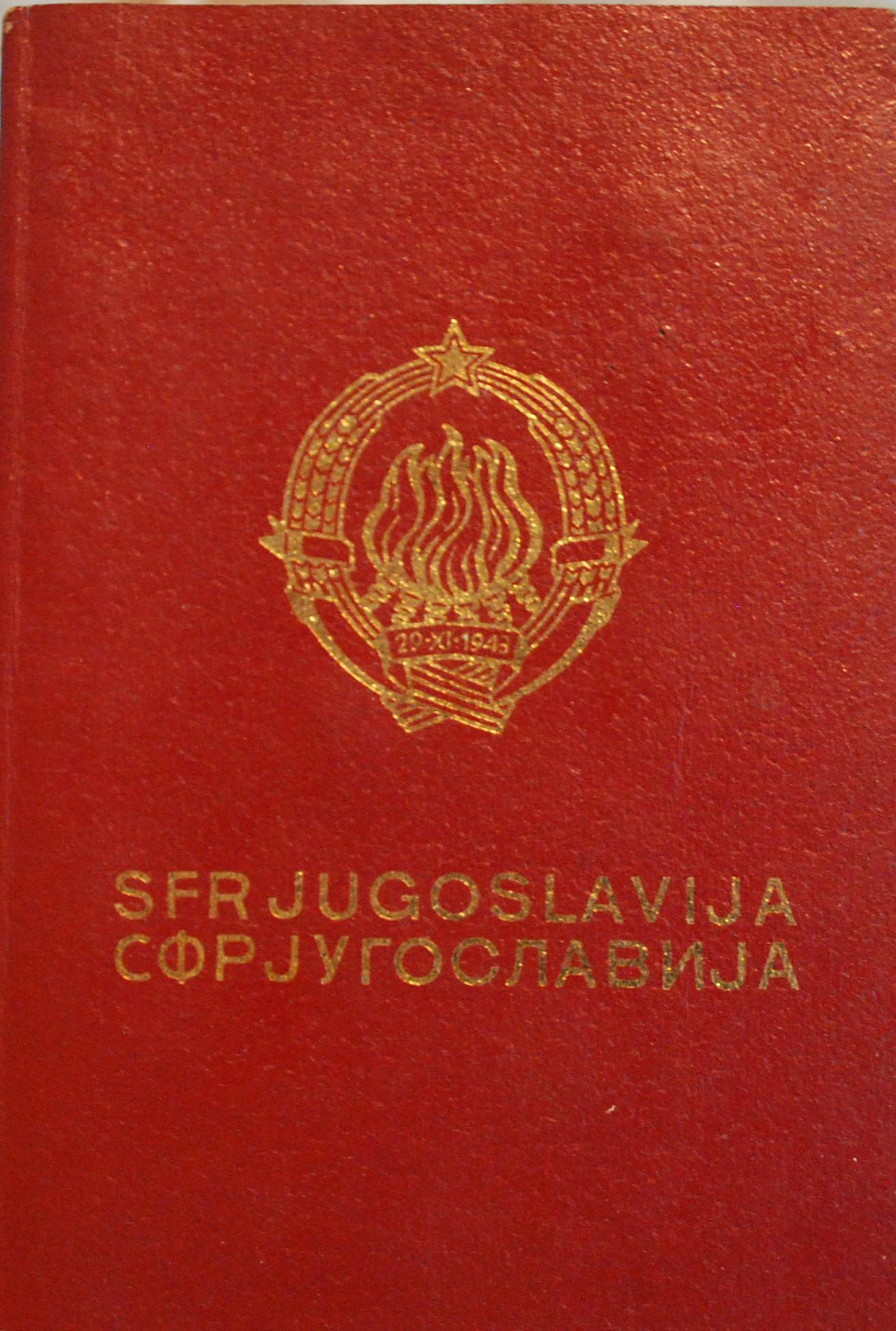
- The front cover of a pre-1992 Yugoslav passport.
- Type: Passport
- Issued by: Yugoslavia
- Purpose: Identification
- Eligibility: Yugoslav citizenship
- Expiration: 1 January 2002 (SFR Yugoslavia); 31 December 2011 (FR Yugoslavia)

The Yugoslav passport was issued to citizens of Yugoslavia for the purpose of international travel. The passport of SFR Yugoslavia has been described as highly regarded and that with it immigrants were able to find jobs among European firms trading with the East and other countries. It was also described as "one of the most convenient in the world, as it was one of the few with which a person could travel freely through both the East and West" during the Cold War.

Under the Yugoslav federal system, each constituent republic or Serbian autonomous province had its own register of citizens, and issued a somewhat distinct variety of passports. In particular, Yugoslav passports issued in SR Macedonia were printed in Macedonian and French; those issued in SR Slovenia were in Slovene and French, rather than in Serbo-Croatian; those issued in Socialist Autonomous Province of Kosovo were in Albanian, Serbo-Croatian and French; those issued in Socialist Autonomous Province of Vojvodina were in Serbo-Croatian, Hungarian and French.

Following the breakup of Yugoslavia, passports were issued in order with the Law on Travel Documents of Yugoslav Nationals, which came into force on 26 July 1996, although the country came into existence in 1992. They were navy blue in color and have two inscriptions in golden letters – Савезна Република Југославија (Federal Republic of Yugoslavia) at the top and the word "passport" written in three languages: Serbian (Cyrillic script), English, and French at the bottom divided by the coat of arms.

All passports issued by the SFR Yugoslavia became invalid on 1 January 2002, but following the restructuring of the FRY into the State Union of Serbia and Montenegro in 2003, passports with the new name were not issued due to the expected breakup of the union, which eventually happened in 2006.

Following Montenegro's independence, citizens of Montenegro used the same travel document as Serbia until 2008, the only difference being in issuing authority, in this case, the Ministry of Interior of Montenegro.

All passports issued by the FR Yugoslavia became invalid on 31 December 2011.

== Other passports issued by Yugoslavia ==
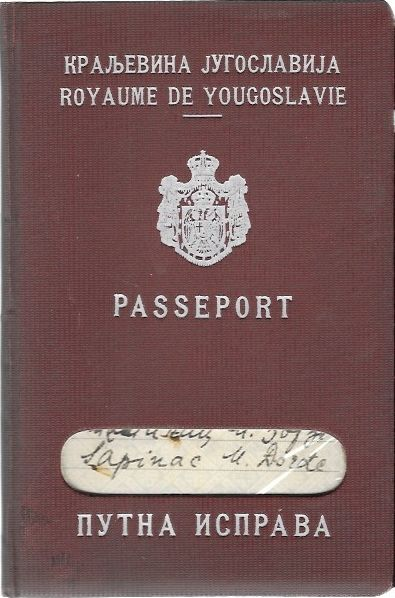
Passport of the Kingdom of Yugoslavia

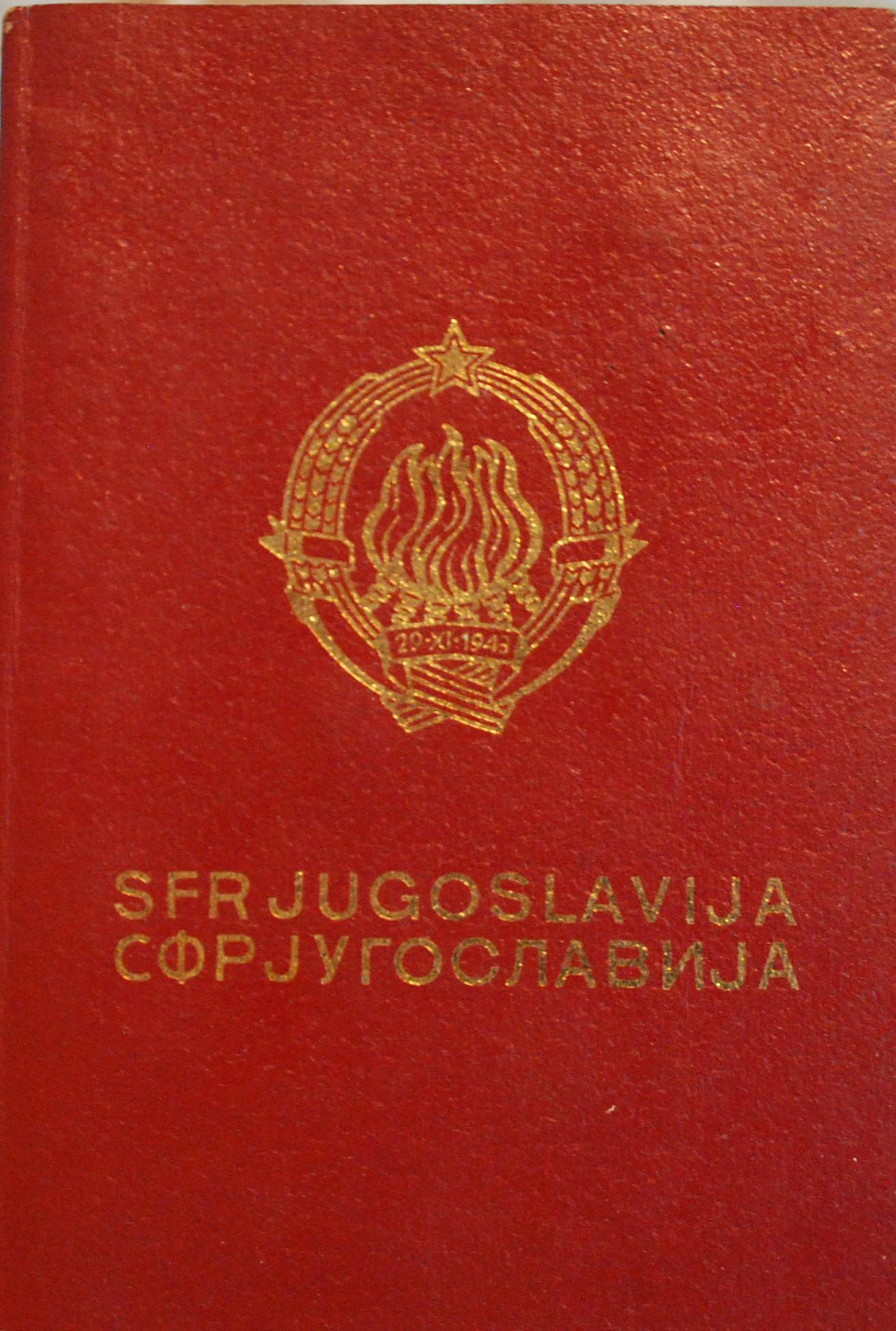
Passport of the Socialist Federal Republic of Yugoslavia

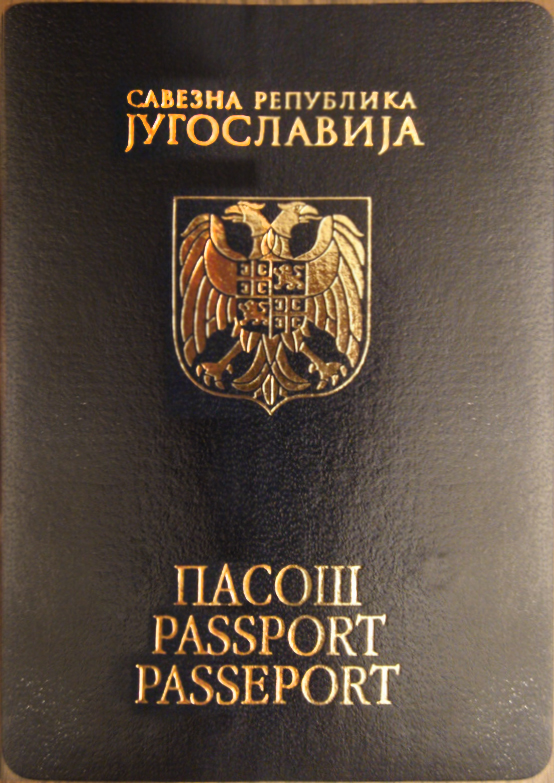
Passport of the Federal Republic of Yugoslavia

== See also ==
- Bosnia and Herzegovina passport
- Croatian passport
- Kosovo passport
- Montenegrin passport
- North Macedonian passport
- Serbian passport
- Slovenian passport
