= Visa policy of Serbia =

Policy on permits required to enter Serbia

Visitors to Serbia must obtain an e-Visa unless they are citizens of one of the visa-exempt countries.

Visa policy of Serbia is similar to the visa policy of the Schengen Area. Serbia grants visa-free entry to most Schengen Annex II nationalities, except for Brunei, El Salvador, Guatemala, Honduras, Kiribati, Malaysia, Mauritius, Marshall Islands, Micronesia, Nicaragua, Samoa, Solomon Islands, Timor-Leste, Tonga and Taiwan. It also grants visa-free entry to several additional countries - Armenia, Azerbaijan, Bahrain, Belarus, China, Indonesia, Jamaica, Kazakhstan, Kyrgyzstan, Russia, Suriname and Turkey.

== Visa policy map ==
Visa policy of Serbia Serbia Visa not required - may enter with an ID card (90 days) Visa not required (90 days) Visa not required (30 days) Visa not required (14 days) eVisa

== Visa exemption ==
=== Ordinary passports ===
Holders of ordinary passports of the following countries and territories may enter Serbia without a visa for the following period:

90 days

- Macau^{C}
- South Korea
- Vatican City

90 days within any 180 days

- All European Union member states^{ID}

- Albania^{ID}
- Andorra
- Antigua and Barbuda
- Argentina
- Armenia
- Australia
- Azerbaijan
- Bahrain
- Bosnia and Herzegovina^{ID}
- Brazil
- Canada
- Chile
- Costa Rica
- Dominica
- Georgia
- Grenada
- Iceland^{ID}
- Israel
- Japan
- Kosovo^{ID^{A}}
- Kyrgyzstan
- Liechtenstein
- Mexico
- Moldova
- Monaco
- Montenegro^{ID}
- New Zealand
- North Macedonia^{ID}
- Norway^{ID}
- Palau
- Peru
- Panama
- Saint Kitts and Nevis
- San Marino
- Saint Lucia
- Seychelles
- Singapore
- Switzerland^{ID}
- Trinidad and Tobago
- Turkey
- Tuvalu
- Ukraine
- United Arab Emirates
- United Kingdom^{B}
- United States
- Uruguay
- Venezuela

30 days

- Belarus
- China^{C}
- Kazakhstan
- Russia
- Suriname

30 days within any 1 year

- Bahamas
- Barbados
- Colombia
- Indonesia
- Jamaica
- Paraguay
- Saint Vincent and the Grenadines

14 days

- Hong Kong^{C}

_{ID - May enter with an ID card (including Irish passport card) in lieu of a passport.}
_{ID^{A} - May enter only with an ID card. Kosovar passports are not valid for entry into Serbia.}
_{B - Including all classes of British nationality.}
_{C - For Chinese citizens with People's Republic of China passports, Hong Kong Special Administrative Region passports or Macao Special Administrative Region passports only.}

Date of visa changes

Citizens of Bosnia and Herzegovina and Montenegro have never required a visa to enter Serbia.

- Unknown: Mexico
- April 1966^{*}: Tunisia
- August 1966^{*}: Cuba
- October 1971^{*}: Costa Rica
- May 1973^{*}: Chile
- October 1985^{*}: Bolivia
- February 1987^{*}: Seychelles
- November 1989^{*}: Argentina
- March 1998^{*}: North Macedonia
- December 1999^{*}: Belarus
- May 2003^{*}: Andorra, Australia, Austria, Belgium, Canada, Croatia, Cyprus, Czechia, Denmark, Estonia, Finland, France, Germany, Greece, Iceland, Ireland, Israel, Italy, Latvia, Liechtenstein, Lithuania, Luxembourg, Malta, Monaco, Netherlands, New Zealand, Norway, Poland, Portugal, San Marino, Singapore, Slovakia, Slovenia, South Korea, Spain, Sweden, Switzerland, United Kingdom, United States, Vatican City. (unilateral)
- June 2007: Romania (unilateral)
- March 2008: Russia (unilateral)
- December 2009^{*}: Israel
- October 2010^{*}: Brazil, Turkey
- December 2010^{*}: Kazakhstan
- May 2011: Japan
- October 2011^{*}: Albania (resumed), Ukraine, Uruguay
- November 2011: Hong Kong
- January 2013^{*}: Macau
- August 2013: United Arab Emirates (unilateral)
- July 2014: Mongolia
- June 2015: Bahrain, Kuwait, Oman and Qatar (unilateral)
- August 2015: Moldova
- January 2017: China
- May 2017: Peru (unilateral)
- September 2017: India and Iran (unilateral)
- October 2017: Indonesia (unilateral)
- December 2017: Guinea-Bissau (unilateral)
- January 2018: Suriname (unilateral)
- February 2018: Bahamas, Barbados, Jamaica, Saint Vincent and the Grenadines, Paraguay, Colombia (unilateral)
- March 2018: Georgia
- June 2018: Azerbaijan and Burundi (unilateral)
- November 2018: Antigua and Barbuda, Dominica, Grenada, Trinidad and Tobago (unilateral)
- November 2018: Kyrgyzstan
- January 2019: Palau and Saint Kitts and Nevis (unilateral)
- September 2019: Suriname (bilateral)
- November 2019: Armenia (unilateral)
- April 2025: Venezuela

Cancelled:

- May 1978 - N/A^{*}: Bangladesh
- January 1985 - January 2003^{*}: Botswana
- June 1972 - January 2003^{*}: Iraq
- N/A - January 2003^{*}: Niger
- November 1970 - N/A^{*}: Pakistan
- December 1970 - N/A^{*}: Iran
- March 1971 - N/A^{*} (resumed in 2017): India
- August 1975 - January 2003^{*}: Zambia
- June 1985 - January 2003^{*}: Zimbabwe
- January 2018: Malaysia
- October 2018: Iran
- November 2022: Burundi
- November 2022: Tunisia
- January 2023: India
- January 2023: Guinea-Bissau
- February 2023: Bolivia
- April 2023: Cuba
- April 2025: Mongolia
- April 2025: Qatar
- April 2025: Kuwait
- April 2025: Oman

==== Substitute visa ====
Holders of a valid multiple-entry visa issued by any Schengen Area member state, Cyprus, Ireland, the United Kingdom or the United States may enter Serbia without a visa for a maximum stay of 90 days within any 180-day period, provided that the visa remains valid for the entire length of stay.

Holders of a residence permit issued by any Schengen Area member state, Cyprus, Ireland or the United States may enter Serbia without a visa for a maximum stay of 90 days within any 180-day period.

=== Non-ordinary passports ===
In addition to countries whose citizens are visa-exempt, holders of diplomatic, official / service passports of the following countries and territories may enter Serbia without a visa for the following period (unless otherwise noted):

90 days

- Angola
- Algeria
- Bangladesh
- Ecuador
- Egypt
- Guatemala
- Guinea
- India
- Iraq
- Lebanon
- North Korea
- Morocco
- Myanmar
- Paraguay
- Qatar
- Russia
- Senegal
- Thailand
- Vanuatu
- Vietnam

90 days within any 180 days

- Benin
- Burundi
- Republic of the Congo
- Eswatini
- Ghana
- Jordan
- Mongolia
- São Tomé and Príncipe
- Tajikistan
- Togo
- Uzbekistan

90 days within any 6 months

- Cuba

60 days within any 6 months

- Dominican Republic

30 days

- Cambodia
- Iran
- Laos
- Pakistan

30 days within any 1 year

- Guinea-Bissau

=== Future changes ===
Serbia has signed visa exemption agreements with the following countries, but they have not yet entered into force:

Country	Passports	Agreement signed on
Saudi Arabia	Diplomatic,special,service	2 September 2026
Honduras	All	26 September 2025
Solomon Islands	All	26 September 2025
Nepal	Diplomatic, official	26 September 2024
Guatemala	Ordinary	22 September 2023
Maldives	Diplomatic, service	9 May 2023
Palestine	Diplomatic, service	09 January 2020
Vanuatu	All	21 November 2019

== Electronic visa (e-Visa) ==
From June 2025, citizens of countries requiring a visa in advance can apply for and receive a type C or type D visa through the e-Visa website.

== General entry requirements for Serbia ==
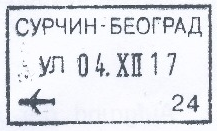
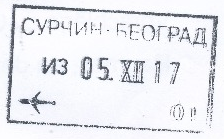
Entry and exit stamps on a blank sheet issued at Belgrade Nikola Tesla Airport.

The following are general entry requirements for Serbia:

- Valid passport/travel document;
- Valid visa in the passport, if a Serbian visa is required for passport holders of the respective country;
- Proof of sufficient funds for staying in Serbia. Sufficient funds are considered to be 50 euros per day of stay, proved by possession of the appropriate amount of cash, bank statement, traveler's cheques, credit cards or a letter of guarantee;
- Certificate of vaccination or a note that he/she has not contracted a contagious disease despite coming from an area affected by a pandemic, as defined by the information of the Ministry of Health.
- If underage children are traveling with one of their parents, it is necessary to submit a relevant certified authorization by the other parent; or if the child is traveling with a third person such authorization is required from both parents or guardian;
- It is recommended to have a health insurance for the period of stay in Serbia, covering possible medical costs to the amount of not less than 20,000 euros.

== Visa requirements ==
Serbian visa specimen

=== Requirements for tourist / business visa ===
Tourist visa entitles its holder only for tourism trip and visit to relatives and / or friends. Tourist visa holders are prohibited from engaging in business or work activities in Serbia.

General visa requirements:

Valid passport (passport must be valid at least 90 days from issue date of visa) Letter of invitation:

- Invitation letter for a private visit certified by the relevant authority of the Republic of Serbia;
- Invitation letter for a business visit by a company in Serbia;
- Invitation letter for a tourist trip – a proof of payment for the trip issued by a travel agency (voucher or other type of payment receipt);
- Completed visa application form: (PDF);
- Photo (size 3.5x4.5 cm);
- Return ticket or Itinerary (copy of driving license and insurance if traveling by car);
- Proof of sufficient funds for staying in Serbia;
- Health insurance;
- Visa fee.

Visa applications should be submitted to the Embassy or Consulate General of the Republic of Serbia abroad.

For the issuance of a transit visa, a person should have an entry visa for the country entering after the Republic of Serbia. In case a visa is not required for that country, the visa applicant will be asked to present other documents explaining the purpose of his/her visit there.

Serbian diplomatic mission reserves the right to request additional documentation. Incomplete applications will not be accepted.

=== Requirements for temporary residence visa / work visa ===
Anyone wishing to live and work in Serbia will be required to apply for a temporary residence permit (for nationals requiring a visa, a temporary residence visa has to be obtained before entry). To obtain a temporary visa for employment purposes, you will need to secure a job offer from a Serbian company or government department, or a foreign company based in Serbia.

The criteria for approval of an employment visa include suitable educational qualifications or work experience, a secured employment contract in Serbia, proof of adequate means of subsistence in Serbia, police confirmation that you have no criminal record, and a satisfactory medical examination. All official documents must be translated into Serbian.

=== Requirements for permanent residence ===
Permanent residency in Serbia can be acquired after five years of temporary residency, three years of temporary residency if married to a Serbian citizen and on special basis.

== Obligatory registration ==
If foreign travelers stay at a hotel, hostel or other commercial accommodation during their visit to Serbia, they are not required to register with the police, since the accommodation will complete the registration on their behalf and issue a receipt confirming it (if not automatically issued, the traveler should request it).

When staying in a private accommodation, the owner of the apartment / house must register the foreigner with the police station of the precinct in which the residence is located (alternatively, the owner can issue a written authorization in advance through a notary for the foreigner to register him/herself within 24 hours of the foreigner entering the country. The process involves filling in an online form (also available at major police stations) which is signed and stamped by a police officer.

Visitors should safeguard this form during the stay in the country, as it may be checked by police inside the country and / or when exiting Serbia. Failing to complete the registration may result in a RSD 5,000-150,000 fine (also for the accommodation provider / host), imprisonment and / or deportation.

== Visitor statistics ==
Most visitors arriving in Serbia for tourism (counting only those in registered tourist accommodations) were from the following countries of nationality:

Country	2023	2022	2021
Turkey	201,440	125,602	48,936
Russia	170,884	123,425	63,297
Bosnia and Herzegovina	158,824	148,773	102,515
Germany	123,059	105,792	57,574
Bulgaria	110,419	81,661	22,425
North Macedonia	109,738	92,046	52,471
Croatia	108,161	89,860	39,327
Romania	100,055	74,590	27,624
Montenegro	96,079	80,656	58,516
China	92,125	32,591	16,451
Total	2,134,305	1,772,763	871,239

== See also ==
- Visa requirements for Serbian citizens
- Visa policy of the Schengen Area
- Visa policy of Kosovo
