= Serbian nationality law =

Citizenship Act of the Republic of Serbia

National Assembly of Serbia
- Long title: An Act regulating the citizenship of the Republic of Serbia
- Passed: October 20, 1979 (Note: First time as the Act on Citizenship of the Socialist Republic of Serbia.)
- Passed: December 14, 2004
- Signed by: President Boris Tadić
- Signed: December 29, 2004
- Status: Current legislation

Serbian nationality law is regulated by the 2004 Citizenship Act, based primarily on the principle of jus sanguinis. Article 23 of the citizenship law stipulates that any foreign national with Serbian descent has the right to acquire Serbian citizenship by written request. In certain cases, the act also allows dual citizenship, allowing an individual the right to retain their current citizenship and receive Serbian citizenship.

The 2007 amendments enabled ethnic Serbs residing outside Serbia the right to citizenship. These amendments, adopted after the Montenegrin independence referendum, 2006, also allowed citizens of Montenegro living in Serbia the right to gain citizenship, if they submit the request within a 5-year period.

== Acquisition of citizenship ==
- Acquiring citizenship by descent - citizenship by descent is limited to one generation (either parent must be registered as Serbian at time of birth) and the applicant cannot be older than 23 years of age at the time.
- Acquiring citizenship by birth
- Acquiring citizenship by admission (naturalization) - at least three years of uninterrupted permanent residence in Serbia.

== Termination and reacquisition of citizenship ==
- Upon naturalisation and admission to the citizenship of the Republic of Serbia, release from any previous foreign nationality or evidence that you will be released from it.
- Termination of citizenship by release
- Termination of citizenship by renunciation
- Reacquisition of citizenship by the Republic of Serbia

== Visa requirement for Serbian citizens ==
As of 2023, Serbian citizens have visa-free or visa on arrival access to 138 countries and territories, ranking the Serbian passport 38th overall in terms of travel freedom according to the Henley Passport Index and among the five passports with the most improved rating since 2006.

== Notable naturalized people ==
- Yvonne Anderson, sportswoman.
- Charles Cather, social media influencer.
- Cléo, sportsman.
- Mohammed Dahlan, politician.
- Ralph Fiennes, English actor.
- Dmitrij Gerasimenko, sportsman.
- Evandro Goebel, sportsman.
- Arnaud Gouillon, humanitarian.
- Peter Handke, writer.
- Charles Jenkins, sportsman.
- Guélor Kanga, sportsman.
- DeMarcus Nelson, sportsman.
- El Fardou Ben Nabouhane, sportsman.
- Richard Odada, sportsman.
- Obiora Odita, sportsman.
- Danielle Page, sportswoman.
- Victor Ponta, politician.
- Kevin Punter, sportsman.
- Steven Seagal, actor.
- Yingluck Shinawatra, politician.
- Arkady Vyatchanin, sportsman.
- Corey Walden, sportsman.
- Aleksandr Komarov, sportsman.

== See also ==
- Citizenship
- Nationality law
- Serbian passport
