= List of minimum driving ages =

Minimum age to drive by country (2024): 25 18 18, supervised driving from the age of 17 18, supervised driving from the age of 16 17 17, supervised driving from the age of 16 16 15 No data

A minimum driving age is the youngest age at which a person is permitted by law to drive a motor vehicle on public roads, including to practice for a driving test and obtain a driving licence.

Minimum driving age laws are in place in most places, though the age varies between jurisdictions. In most jurisdictions, the minimum driving age for cars is 18. In many cases, persons below the minimum driving age may be able to drive under supervision from a competent driver or driving instructor. The lowest minimum driving age is in South Dakota in the United States, where a person aged fourteen can drive under adult supervision and a person aged fourteen and a half can obtain a driver's licence and drive unsupervised, albeit with restrictions. In other parts of the US, persons as young as fourteen can be given permission to drive where such permission would not normally be afforded due to exceptional hardship.

The minimum driving age can vary by vehicle type, with many jurisdictions operating lower minimum ages for motorcycles than cars, for instance.h

== Africa ==
State	Minimum driving age	Notes
Algeria	18	
Cameroon	16	
Egypt	18 (cars); 16 (motorcycles)	
Eswatini	18	
Ethiopia	18	
Ghana	18	
Kenya	18 (cars); 16 (motorcycles)	
Lesotho	18	
Libya	18	
Mali	18; 21 (Allowed to rent cars)	
Mauritania	18; 15 (Motorcycles)	
Mauritius	18 (cars); 17 (motorcycles); 15 (autocycles)	
Mayotte (France)	18	
Morocco	18 (cars); 21 (trucks); 16 (motorcycles)	
Mozambique	17	
Namibia	18	
Niger	16 (light motor vehicles); 18 (commercial passenger vehicles)	
Nigeria	18	
Réunion (France)	18	One may obtain a learner's license and be legally allowed to drive with supervision at age 15. A full driving license will be fully granted by age 18.
Rwanda	18	
Senegal	16	
South Africa	18; 17 (provisional licence); 16 (motorcycles up to 125 cc)	A Code 1 licence is obtainable at age 16, and allows for the use of motorcycles with engines that do not exceed 125 cc. The National Road Traffic act specifies that a driver needs to be 17 to legally obtain a provisional licence for all motor vehicles under 3500 kg. To obtain any other class of driving licence, one must be 18 years old.
Tanzania	18	
Tunisia	18	
Uganda	18	
Zambia	16	
Zimbabwe	16	

== Americas ==
=== North America ===
State	Minimum driving age	Notes
Canada	varies between provinces	See also: Driver's licences in Canada
Mexico	15 (with parental supervision), 16 (with parental agreement), 18	See also: Driving licence in Mexico
United States	16 is legal driving age, but permit can be obtained at 14 or 15 depending on state laws	See also: Driver's licenses in the United States

=== Central America ===
State	Minimum driving age	Notes
Costa Rica	18	
El Salvador	15	Driving age for cars is 15 with supervision. Unrestricted licence available at 18.
Guatemala	16 (with parental approval), 18	
Honduras	18	
Nicaragua	18	
Panama	16 (with parental approval), 18	

=== South America ===
State	Minimum driving age	Notes
Argentina	17 (with parental approval), 18 (without)	21 is the minimum age to drive a truck, bus or emergency vehicle. 16 is the minimum age to drive a moped (without passengers). Parental approval is necessary for any license issued to any individual aged under 18.
Bolivia	18	
Brazil	18	18 is the minimum age to drive a mopeds, motorcycle, and cars. 21 is the minimum age to drive a trucks, buses, or transporting. Drivers have to be previously licensed in cat. 'B' for at least one year before applying for a professional license. 'C' category are usually for load trucks, 'D' for buses and trucks and 'E' for articulated vehicles.
Chile	17 (with parental approval), 18, 20 (professional license)	
Colombia	16, 18 (professional license)	
Ecuador	18	
Falkland Islands	17	
French Guiana	17	
Guyana	17	
Paraguay	18	
Peru	18	
Suriname	18	
Uruguay	18	
Venezuela	18	

=== Caribbean ===
State	Minimum driving age	Notes
Anguilla	18	
Bahamas	17	
Cayman Islands	17	
Cuba	18	
Curaçao	18	
Dominican Republic	18	
Guadeloupe	17	
Jamaica	16-17 (learners permit or with adult supervision), 18 fully licensed	
Martinique	17	
Puerto Rico	16 (with learner's permit), 18	
Saint Barthélemy	17	
Saint Martin	18	
Trinidad and Tobago	17	
St. Kitts and Nevis	17 (for permit), 18 (for license)	
US Virgin Islands	16 (with learner's permit), 18	

== Asia ==
=== Western Asia ===
State	Minimum driving age	Notes
Bahrain	18	
Iran	18	You can go to driving class 1 to 3 weeks before the driving exam. After reaching the age of 18 you can get the driving licence.
Iraq	16 for motorcycles 18 for cars	
Israel	16 years for motorcycles 16 years 6 months with driving teacher 16 years 9 months for cars with 3 months parental supervision all times and 3 more months at night	
Jordan	18	
Kuwait	18 for Kuwaitis; 21 for non-Kuwaitis	
Lebanon	18	
Oman	18	
Qatar	18; 21 for heavy vehicles	
Saudi Arabia	17 years 6 Months for cars, 16 years 6 months for temporary permits, 15 years 6 Months for motorcycles	Saudi Arabia Law specifies 18, 17 and 16 for car licenses, temporary permits and motorcycles respectively, but calculates age based on the Islamic Calendar which has shorter years.
Syria	18	
United Arab Emirates	17 for cars and motorcycles	
Yemen	18	

=== South Asia ===
State	Minimum driving age	Notes
Afghanistan	18 (for men) Prohibited (for women)	As of 2024, the right to drive is not extended to women. Afghanistan is currently the only country to ban the right to drive based on gender.
Bangladesh	18	
India	18	See also: Driving licence in India
Nepal	16 for two-wheelers, 18 for four-wheelers	
Pakistan	18	
Sri Lanka	17	
Maldives	18	

=== East Asia ===
State	Minimum driving age	Notes
China	18	
Hong Kong	18	Special Administrative Region of China
Japan	16 (motorcycles under 400 cc); 18 (ordinary/semi-medium vehicle and motorcycles over 401 cc)	See also: Driving license in Japan
Macau	18	Special Administrative Region of China
South Korea	18 for regular passenger cars and motorbikes over 125 cc 16 for motorbikes under 125 cc 19 for commercial license	See also: Driving license in South Korea
Taiwan	18	See also: Driver's license in Taiwan

=== Southeast Asia ===
State	Minimum driving age	Notes
Brunei	18	
Myanmar	18	
Cambodia	18	
Indonesia	17	See also: Driving license in Indonesia
Laos	18	
Malaysia	17 (cars), 16 (motorcycles)	See also: Driving licence in Malaysia
Philippines	16 (student permit); 17 (non-professional driver's license); 18 (professional driver's license)	See also: Driving license in the Philippines
Singapore	18	See also: Driving licence in Singapore
Thailand	18 (cars and motorcycles); 15 (motorcycles with 110 cc or smaller engines)	See also: Driving licence in Thailand Other restrictions apply to large or specialised vehicles.
Vietnam	16 (motorcycles under 50cc), 18	

== Europe ==
Minimum driving age in Europe Minimum driving age is 18 Minimum driving age is 18; Supervised driving at 17 Minimum driving age is 18; Supervised driving at 16 Minimum driving age is 17 Minimum driving age is 17; Supervised driving at 16 Minimum driving age is 17; Supervised driving at 15 Minimum driving age is 16

=== European Driving Licence Area ===
State	Minimum driving age	Notes
Austria	17 for cars 15 for mopeds	(Start with 15,5 under L17 attendant driving training)
Belgium	18; 16 for mopeds	17 for cars, with learners permit (supervised)
Bulgaria	18; 16 for mopeds	
Croatia	18; 15 for mopeds	
Cyprus	18	See also: Driving licence in Cyprus
Czech Republic	18; 17 with supervision	15 for mopeds.
Denmark	24 for heavy bus, 21 for heavy truck, 17 for cars 15 for mopeds, quads and snowmobiles*	17-year-olds may drive alone from 5 AM to 8 PM. Outside this time frame, a companion with a driver's license is required. The minimum driving age for heavy truck and heavy bus can go down to 18, if the license is obtained during military service *It is only possible to obtain a license for snowmobiles on Greenland.
Estonia	18 for cars, 16 with supervision, 14 for mopeds	Driving age for cars is 16 with supervision. Unrestricted licence available at 18.
Finland	18 for cars, 17 with exception permit, 15 (mopeds, micro cars, tractors)	See also: Driving licence in Finland
France	17, 15 with supervision	Driving age for cars is 15 with supervision. Licence available at 17 with speed restrictions, reduced number of points and blood alcohol level is reduced to 0.2g/L. Restrictions drops after 2 or 3 years of holding a license.
Germany	18, 17 with supervision, 16 for motorcycles up to 125ccm 15 for Scooters/Mopeds up to 50ccm and 45km/h	See also: Driving licence in Germany Driving age for cars is 17 with supervision. Unrestricted licence available at 18. Licenses for mopeds/scooters < 45 km/h at 15 and motorcycles under 125ccm at 16.
Greece	17 16 for motorcycles up to 50 cc and light quadricycles	Driving age for cars is 17 with supervision. Unrestricted license is available at 18.
Hungary	17; 16 for motorcycles under 125 ccm 14 for vehicles under 50 ccm	
Iceland	16	Driving age for cars is 16 with supervision. Unrestricted licence available at 17.
Ireland	17	16 for motorcycles under 125cc, mopeds, work vehicles or land tractors
Italy	17	See also: Driving licence in Italy Driving 17 with supervision of a person under 60 years in possession of full B licence (or superior). Unrestricted licence available at 18.
Latvia	18 for cars (B), trailers (C1, BE, C1E), 24 motorcycles (A), 21 motorcycles (A2), 16 for motorcycles (A1), resting boats, 14 for mopeds (M), 10 for bicycle	16 for cars(B), 21 for motorcycles(A2), trailers(C1, BE, C1E), 16 for motorcycles(A1), 14 for mopeds(M) – if supervised by a person holding a B category licence for at least three years (also known as training driving)
Liechtenstein	18	
Lithuania	14 to 18 (for permit), 18 (for full license) for cars, 15 for mopeds	
Luxembourg	16 for motorcycles 18 for cars	Driving age for low power motorcycles and tractors 16. Driving licence for cars available at 18.
Malta	18	
Netherlands	17 for cars 16 for mopeds and tractors	See also: Driving licence in the Netherlands Driving age for cars is 17 with supervision. Driving lessons available at 16½. Unrestricted licence available at 18.
Norway	18 for cars 16 for mopeds and light motorcycles	See also: Driving licence in Norway
Poland	18, 17 with supervison 16 for tractors and motorcycles up to 125 cc 14 for mopeds and quads	See also: Driving licence in Poland
Portugal	18 for cars, 16 for motorcycles, 14 for motorcycles and tricycles under 50cm3	
Romania	18; 16 for motorcycles up to 125 cc	
Slovakia	17	Driving age for cars is 17 with supervision. Unrestricted licence available at 18.
Slovenia	16 for cars and motorcycles	Driving age for cars is 16 with supervision. Unrestricted licence available at 18.
Spain	15 for mopeds and quads 16 for motorcycles up to 125 cc 18 for general licence	
Sweden	18 for cars 15 for mopeds and tractors	See also: Driving licence in Sweden Driving age for cars is 16 with supervision. Unrestricted licence available at 18.
Switzerland	17 for cars, 16 for scooters, 18 for motorcycles under 35 kW; 14 for mopeds and tractors	Driving age for cars is 17 with supervision. Unrestricted licence available at 18.

=== Rest of Europe ===
State	Minimum driving age	Notes
Albania	18	
Andorra	18	
Armenia	18	
Azerbaijan	18	
Belarus	18	16 – mopeds (AM), <125 cc/11 kW motorcycles (A1); 17 – <80 kW wheeled tractors and self-propelled machines (A) and all kinds of continuous tracked tractors, SPMs and bulldozers (C); 18 – all kinds of motorcycles (A), cars with light trailers and up to 8 passengers buses (B), trucks with light trailers (C), all kinds of wheeled tractors (B), SPMs (D), special vehicles (E) and <1 m^{3} excavators (F); 21 – buses for more than 8 passengers (D), cars, trucks and buses with heavy trailers (BE, CE, DE), trams (F) and trolleybuses (I).
Bosnia and Herzegovina	18 for cars 14 for mopeds	
Georgia	17	
Gibraltar	17	
Guernsey	17	2 or 3 wheel vehicles, 14 under 50cc <4 kW, 16 for 50–125cc <50 km/h <11 kW, 17 for >125cc
Isle of Man	16	16 moped, 16 motorbike <125cc <11Kw, 17 motorbike >125cc.
Jersey	17	2 wheel vehicles, 16 <50cc, 2 or 3 wheel vehicles 17 <125cc, 18 >240cc.
Kazakhstan	18	16 for mopeds and light motorcycles (A1). Special categories such as trucks, buses, and vehicles with trailers require higher ages and prior experience
Kosovo	18	
Moldova	18	
Monaco	18	
Montenegro	18	
Northern Cyprus	18	See also: Driving licence in Northern Cyprus
North Macedonia	18 (16 with parental supervision)	
Russia	18 (16 for motorcycles)	
San Marino	18	
Serbia	18 (17 with adult supervision)	
Ukraine	18	
United Kingdom	17 (cars), 16 (mopeds and tractors) (cars if disabled and in receipt of PIP or DLA), 16 (Light Quadricycle)	See also: Driving licence in the United Kingdom

== Oceania ==
State	Minimum driving age	Notes
American Samoa	16	
Australia	18 (VIC); 17 (ACT, NSW, QLD, SA, TAS, WA); 16½ years (NT)	See also: Driver licences in Australia The minimum age to obtain a car or motorcycle learner license which allows driving under supervision is 15 years and 9 months, in the ACT. All other states and territories require learner drivers to be 16 years of age or older. Driving unsupervised by progressing to a provisional license is possible after 12 months, with minimum supervised hours (including nighttime driving) required in the form of a logbook. The exception to this is the Northern Territory, where learner drivers can progress to a provisional license after 6 months, without the need for a driving test or logbook.
Fiji	17	
Guam	16	
Marshall Islands	18	
New Zealand	16½	See also: Driver licence in New Zealand The minimum age to obtain a car or motorcycle learner licence which allows driving under supervision is 16. The minimum possible age to obtain a full licence, without any supervision or conditions, is 17½ years if a driver completes an advanced driving course. Without an advanced driving course, the minimum age is 18, the same as a heavy vehicle licence.
Northern Mariana Islands	15½ years	
Papua New Guinea	18	
Tonga	18	
