= European driving licence =

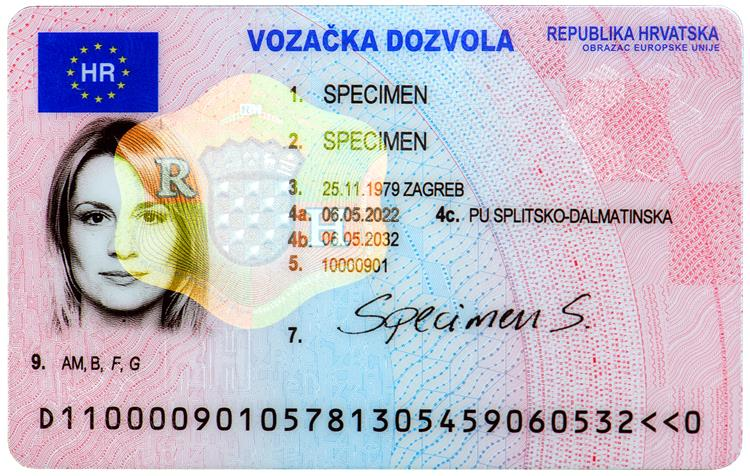
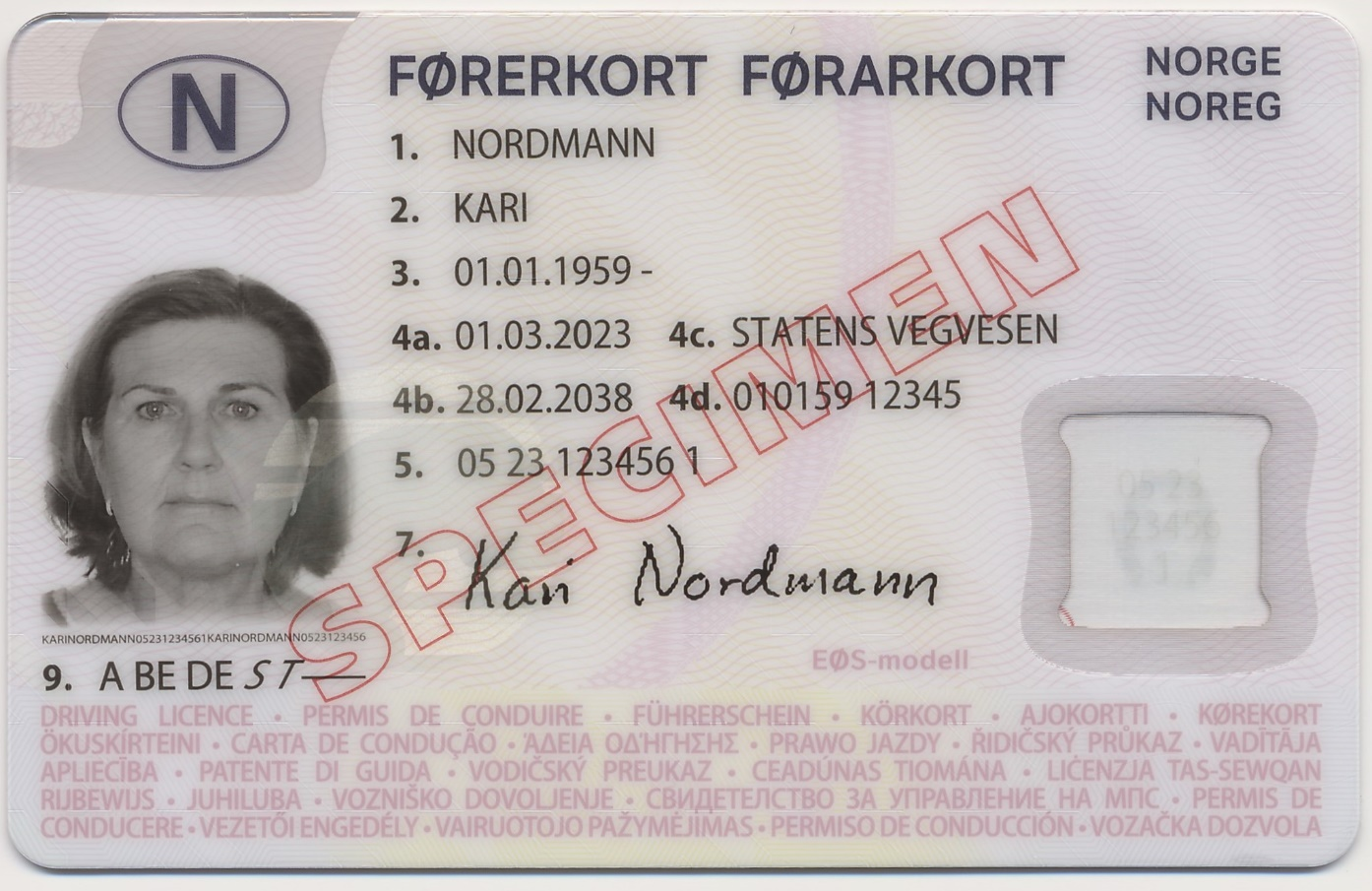
- Examples of the European driving licence issued in Croatia and Norway. Licences issued in Iceland, Liechtenstein and Norway do not feature the EU flag.
- Issued by: EU member states and member states of the European Economic Area (Note: The legal acquis is marked as EEA-relevant by the EU, and is incorporated into the EEA Agreement (by Iceland, Liechtenstein and Norway).)
- First issued: 29 July 1991
- Purpose: Access to unified driving licence in any of the EEA member states
- Valid in: The European Economic Area
- Eligibility: EEA residency

The European driving licence is a driving licence issued by the member states of the European Economic Area (EEA); all 27 EU member states and three EFTA member states; Iceland, Liechtenstein and Norway, which give shared features the various driving licence styles formerly in use. It is credit card-style with a photograph. They were introduced to replace the 110 different plastic and paper driving licences of the 300 million drivers in the EEA. The main objective of the licence is to reduce the risk of fraud.

A driving licence issued by a member state of the EEA is recognised throughout the EEA and can be used as long as it is valid, the driver is old enough to drive a vehicle of the equivalent category, and the licence is not suspended or restricted and has not been revoked in the issuing country. If the holder of an EEA driving licence moves to another EEA country, the licence can be exchanged for a driving licence from the new EEA country. However, as all EEA driving licences are recognised throughout the EEA, it is usually not necessary to exchange it before it expires.

The exception is for those holding EEA driving licences issued in exchange for a non‑EEA licence. When holding a converted licence, one should not assume the licence is recognized when moving to another EEA country, which might require that the driving licence be converted again to a licence issued by that country.

== History ==
=== 1980–1996 ===
The first step to a European driving licence was taken on 4 December 1980, when the Council of Ministers adopted Council Directive 80/1263/EEC on the introduction of a Community driving licence, which established a Community model national licence that guaranteed the mutual recognition by the Member States of national licences. It also established the practice of exchange of licences by holders moving from one Member State to another.

=== 1996–2013 ===
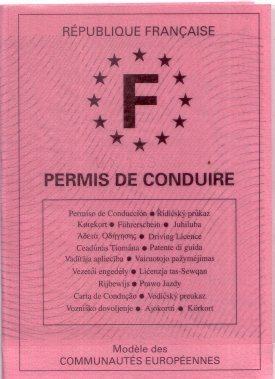
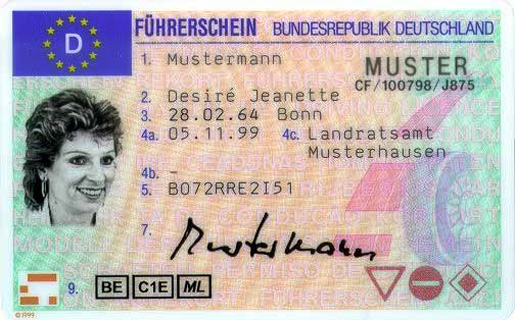
Examples of the paper and plastic card models in 91/439/EEC

Directive 91/439/EEC
- European Union directive
- Title: Council Directive on driving licences
- Made by: Council of the European Union
- Made under: Art. 75 TEC
- Journal reference: L237, pp 1–24

History
- Date made: 29 July 1991
- Entry into force: 24 August 1991
- Implementation date: 1 July 1996

Other legislation
- Replaces: Directive 80/1263/EEC
- Replaced by: Directive 2006/126/EC

On 29 July 1991, the Council of Ministers adopted the Council of the European Union Directive 91/439/EEC on driving licences. The directive required EU Member States to adopt laws implementing the directive before 1 July 1994, which took effect on 1 July 1996. Directive 80/1263/EEC was repealed on the same date.

Directive 91/439/EEC was incorporated into the EEA Agreement through Decision of the EEA Joint Committee No 7/94 of 21 March 1994, and specified driving licence in the European Union and the European Economic Area until its repeal on 19 January 2013.

==== Provisions ====
The Council of the European Union Directive 91/439/EEC harmonised the categories of driving licences among the Member States and established two Community driving licence models, one paper version and one plastic card version. It furthermore established an obligatory test of knowledge (theory) and a test of skills and behaviour (practical) which had to be successfully passed before an individual is offered a driving licence. It also required an applicant to meet the minimum standards of physical and mental fitness to drive. The directive specified the minimum ages for driving different types of vehicles, and established progressive access in categories A, C, and D, from light vehicles to larger or more powerful vehicles. The directive stipulated that it is mandatory to have the normal residence in the Member State issuing the licence.

==== Amendments ====
The Directive was substantially amended by nine directives and two acts of accession. The plastic card version of the Community licence model, for example, was added to the Directive by Council Directive 96/47/EC of 23 July 1996.

=== Since 2013 ===
Directive 2006/126/EC
- European Union directive
- Text with EEA relevance
- Title: Directive of the European Parliament and of the Council on driving licences (Recast)
- Made by: European Parliament & Council
- Made under: Art. 71 TEC
- Journal reference: L403, pp. 18–60
- EEA Joint Committee decision: 29/2008

History
- Date made: 30 December 2006
- Entry into force: 19 January 2007
- Implementation date: 19 January 2013

Other legislation
- Replaces: Directive 91/439/EEC

In March 2006, the Council of Ministers adopted a Directive proposed by the European Commission to create a single European driving licence to replace the 110 different models in existence throughout the EU/EEA at the time. The European Parliament adopted the Directive in December 2006. Directive 2006/126/EC was published in the Official Journal of the European Union on 30 December 2006. Its provisions took effect on 19 January 2013; Directive 91/439/EEC was then concurrently repealed.

==== Provisions ====
The licence is a credit-card-style, single plastic-coated document, very difficult to counterfeit. The document is renewable every 10 or 15 years depending on the member state. Several member states have the option to include a microchip containing information about the card holder on the card.

Some categories like C and D are issued for five years only. After expiration, a medical check-up is necessary in order to renew the licence for another five years.

==== EEA relevance ====
The EEA (blue and green)

The provisions of Directive 2006/126/EC mention that it has European Economic Area (EEA) relevance, meaning that its provisions apply to all 27 EU member states, as well as Iceland, Liechtenstein, and Norway, through incorporation into the agreement on the EEA.

The Directive was incorporated into the EEA agreement through Decision of the EEA Joint committee No 29/2008 of 14 March 2008 amending Annex XIII (Transport) to the EEA Agreement. The Decision made some adaptions to the directive, notably: the distinguishing sign issuing the licence is encircled by an ellipse instead of being printed on the European flag, the words "driving licence" in Icelandic and Norwegian languages were added, and the words “European Communities model” were replaced by “EEA model”.

==== Switzerland ====
Although Switzerland is a member state of EFTA, it is not a contracting party of EEA Agreement. Switzerland is instead linked to the EU by a series of bilateral agreements and has generally adopted much of the harmonised EU legislation with regard to driving licences. Switzerland has used categories similar to the EU system of vehicle categories since the 2000s, and Swiss driving licences resemble EEA-style credit-card licences, comparable to other non-EU/EEA European countries.

==== French Overseas Collectivities and Territories ====
Likewise, French Overseas Collectivities and Territories are not in the EEA despite being part of the French Republic. However, with the exception of Saint Pierre and Miquelon (which uses 'standard' French driving licences) and Wallis and Futuna (which is the last remaining French territory still issuing non-credit card sized licences), all Overseas Collectivities of France have followed EU harmonisation standards, as well as the 'EEA model'. As of May 2024, Saint Martin is the only French territory member of the EU to use a different format to the current 'standard' French format.

==== Implementation ====
The directive stipulated that (then) all 31 EEA members states must have adopted laws implementing the directive no later than 19 January 2011. Those laws took effect in all EEA members states on 19 January 2013. All licences issued before that date will become invalid by 2033.

==== Brexit ====
Directive 2006/126/EC applied to the United Kingdom until the transition period after the UK withdrew from the EU terminated on 31 December 2020, as EU law continued to apply to the UK during this period.

From 1 January 2021, European licences are recognized by the UK if the driving test was passed in an EU/EEA country, and can be used both if the holder is visiting or if residing in the UK. They can also be exchanged for a UK driving licence.

UK driving licences can be used when visiting EU/EEA countries with some exceptions. International Driving Permits might be needed in some cases. Depending on which convention the country in question has ratified, a 1949 IDP (Geneva Convention on Road Traffic) might be required in some EEA countries, and a 1968 IDP (Vienna Convention on Road Traffic) in others. However, none of the EEA countries currently require IDPs for visitors staying shorter than 12 months.

=== 4th European Driving Licence Directive ===
Directive 2025/2205
- European Union directive
- Text with EEA relevance
- Title: Directive (EU) 2025/2205 of the European Parliament and of the Council of 22 October 2025 on driving licences, amending Regulation (EU) 2018/1724 of the European Parliament and of the Council and Directive (EU) 2022/2561 of the European Parliament and of the Council, and repealing Directive 2006/126/EC of the European Parliament and of the Council and Commission Regulation (EU) No 383/2012
- Made by: European Parliament and Council of the European Union
- Made under: Art. 91(1) TFEU
- Journal reference: OJ L, 2025/2205

History
- European Parliament vote: 21 October 2025
- Council Vote: 2 October 2025
- Date made: 22 October 2025
- Entry into force: 25 November 2025
- Implementation date: 26 November 2028
- Applies from: 26 November 2029

Preparative texts
- Commission proposal: 1 March 2023

Other legislation
- Replaces: Directive 2006/126/EC of the European Parliament and of the Council

On 1 March 2023, the European Commission released a proposal to modernise the legal framework surrounding driver training, examination, licences and cross-border enforcement of driving offences.

Specifically regarding driving licences, the measures presented included:

- Creation of a European digital driving licence, valid throughout the EU,
- Digitalisation of all licence renewal, replacement and exchange procedures, and
- Lowering the minimum age for obtaining a driving licence for cars and lorries to 17 years old.

These proposals would have to be considered through the usual EU legislative procedure before coming into effect.

The Directive (EU) 2025/2205 (also unofficially called 4th European Driving Licence Directive) was published in the Official Journal of the European Union on 5 November 2025, and entered into force on 25 November 2025. It will be fully applicable from 26 November 2029.

== European digital driving licence ==
On 21 October 2025, the European Parliament approved the creation of a European digital driving licence, valid throughout the EU, according to the internationally recognized ISO standard (ISO/IEC 18013-5) and compatible with the upcoming EU Digital Identity Wallet (EUDI) in accordance with eIDAS 2.0. This is a standardised European digital driving licence, as per the new 'Proposal for a Revision of the Directive on Driving Licences' on 1 March 2023.

=== Preceding digital (mobile) driving licences ===
In July 2019, Norway was the first EU/EEA country to issue a mobile version of its driving licence using a proprietary app on a nationwide basis. This was preceded by limited trial in Finland from 2018-2020. Since then, mobile driving licences have been available in Austria, Denmark, France, Greece, Iceland, Poland, Portugal and Spain. These digital/mobile driving licences all have proprietary implementations and are not valid outside their issuing country.

== Standard data field labelling ==
To help users of different languages to understand what each of the data fields on the licence contains, each is labelled with a number. A legend on the back of the card identifies each field in the issuing authority's language.

1. surname
2. other names^{[a]}
3. date of birth, place of birth^{[d]}^{[c]}
4. a) date of issue, b) date of expiry, c) issuing authority, d) different number from the one under heading 5, for administrative purposes^{[b]}
5. licence number (Can Be Transferred)^{[c]}
6. photograph of holder
7. signature of holder
8. address (Some EU Countries)^{[c]}
9. licence categories
10. first issuing date of the category (in a table, listed per category)
11. expiry date of the category (in a table, listed per category)
12. restrictions (number coded, in a table, listed per category, and once for information applying to all categories)
13. space reserved for the possible entry by the host Member State of information essential for administering the licence
14. space reserved for the possible entry by the Member State which issues the licence of information essential for administering the licence or related to road safety (optional).

The fields for "restrictions" (number 12) contain numeric codes which are used to convey additional information that goes beyond the licence categories. Codes 01-99 are valid EU-wide, while codes 100 and above are national codes valid only for driving in country that issued the licence.

Many countries use field 12 to extend or restrict the standard licence categories, for example placing additional restrictions on young drivers, or extending the categories for holders of old licences as a form of grandfather clause. One common entry in field 13 is 01.06, indicating that the driver must wear glasses or contact lenses.

=== Notes ===
^{a}Such as given names, local variations may occur.
^{b}4(d) is optional. In some countries the personal number is listed.
^{c}This is optional and not implemented by all countries
^{d}Norway and Sweden: a hyphen (-) is shown in lieu of place of birth.

== Categories valid in all EEA member states ==
=== Pre-2013 ===
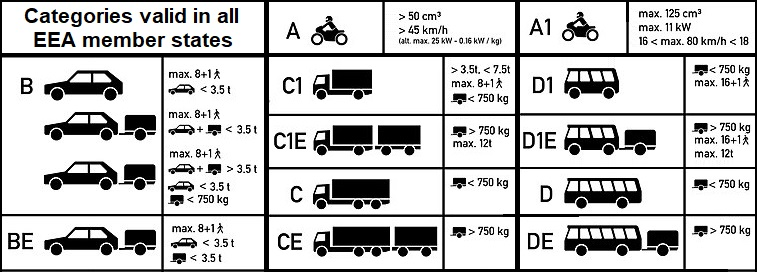
Pre-2013 categories of European driving licences

=== Since 2013 ===
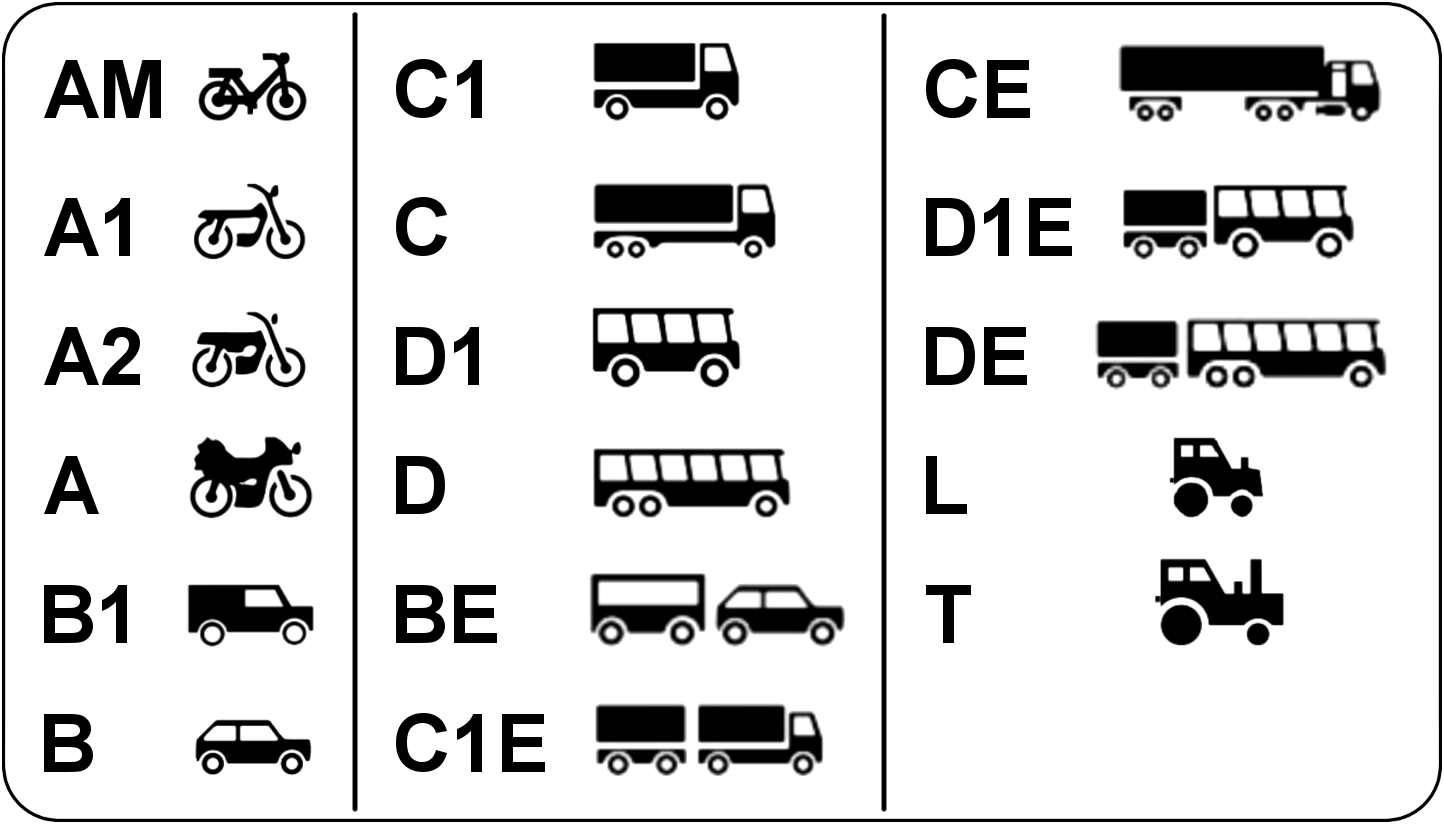
Categories of European driving licences per the EU directive 2006/126/EC

Class	Description	Age of acquisition	Requires	Includes	Remarks
Mopeds
AM	Two-wheel vehicles or three-wheel vehicles and four-wheel vehicles (quadricycles) with a maximum design speed of not more than 45 kilometres per hour (28 mph) and with a cylinder capacity not exceeding 50 cubic centimetres (3.1 cu in).	16 years (18 years in Denmark and Malta; 15 years in Austria, Lithuania, Czech Republic, Finland, Germany, Slovenia, Spain, and Sweden; 14 years in Estonia, Latvia, France, Italy, Poland, and Hungary).			Until 19 January 2013 this class was a national class called "M" in Bulgaria, Finland, Germany, Hungary, Iceland, Ireland, and Norway. It is up to each member state to accept foreign licences with younger ages than the local minimum age of acquisition.
Motorcycles
A1	Motorcycles with a cylinder capacity not exceeding 125 cubic centimetres (7.6 cu in) and a power not exceeding 11 kilowatts (15 hp); and motor tricycles with a power not exceeding 15 kilowatts (20 hp).	16 years. (18 years in Denmark, Greece, Belgium, and the Netherlands).		AM	B licence holders in Czech Republic (only motorcycles with automatic and semi-automatic transmission), Italy, Latvia, Slovakia (after two years and only motorcycles with automatic transmission), Spain (after three years), Poland (after three years), Portugal (at least 25 years old or additional licence for mopeds), and Belgium (after two years) are allowed to drive motorcycles not exceeding 125 cubic centimetres (7.6 cu in) within the respective countries. In Austria (after five years, training of 6 hours), France (after two years, a training of 7 hours), Germany (after 5 years, training of 9x1,5 hours, addition of Code 196, thus only German licences), Greece (after 6 years, at least 27 years old, training of 5 hours, addition of Code 121, thus only Greek licences), Luxembourg (after 2 years, training of 7 hours), and Malta (training of 10 hours), a practical training without exam is needed for B licence holders.
A2	Motorcycles of a power not exceeding 35 kilowatts (47 hp) and with a power/weight ratio not exceeding 0.2 kilowatts per kilogram (0.12 hp/lb) and not derived from a vehicle of more than double its power.	18 years. (20 years in Denmark, Greece, Belgium, and the Netherlands).		A1, AM	Replaced class "A" on 19 January 2013 in Malta.
A	Any motorcycle or motor tricycle not in category A1/A2	20 years. (22 years in Denmark, Greece, Belgium, and the Netherlands). However, access to the driving of motorcycles of this category shall be subject to a minimum of two years' experience on motorcycles under an A2 licence. This requirement as to previous experience may be waived if the candidate is at least 24 years old.		A2, A1, AM	B licence holders who are at least 21 years of age are allowed to drive motor tricycles (including three-wheeled motorcycles with a power exceeding 15 kilowatts (20 hp) in the following countries: Austria, Czech Republic, Finland, France, Germany, Iceland, Italy, Latvia, Spain and Poland (after three years of B licence). In France and Italy, a practical training (at least 7 hours) without an exam is needed for B licence holders who want to drive motor tricycles only, and this option is available only after at least two years of B licence. In the Netherlands it's allowed to drive from the age of at least 18, and if you had your B licence before 19 January 2013. Replaced class "A+" on 19 January 2013 in Malta.
Motor vehicles
B	Motor vehicles with a maximum authorised mass (MAM) not exceeding 3,500 kilograms (7,700 lb) and designed and constructed for the carriage of no more than eight passengers in addition to the driver; motor vehicles in this category may be combined with a trailer having a maximum authorised mass which does not exceed 750 kilograms (1,650 lb). You can also tow heavier trailers if the total MAM of the vehicle and trailer isn't more than 3,500 kilograms (7,700 lb).	18 years (17 years in Ireland, France (since 2024) and Hungary) 17 years in Germany, and the Netherlands (under supervision, from age of 18 without supervision). 17 years in Greece with supervision (from someone who is at least 25 years old and has had a B licence for 5+ years) and from the age of 18 without supervision (only if no accidents were caused while under supervision) 17 years in Austria after 3000 km of driving under supervision. 16 years in Iceland (under supervision after 10 driving lessons, from age of 17 without supervision)		AM (some countries)	In some countries, holders of a B driver licence are also entitled (sometimes with special conditions) to ride motorcycles <= 125 cubic centimetres (7.6 cu in) and power <= 11 kilowatts (15 hp) and ratio power/weight <= 0.1 kilowatts per kilogram (0.061 hp/lb)
BE	Without prejudice to the provisions of type-approval rules for the vehicles concerned, a combination of vehicles consisting of a tractor vehicle in category B and any number of trailers or semi-trailer wheres the maximum authorised mass of the trailer(s) or semi-trailer(s) do not exceed 3,500 kilograms (7,700 lb).	18 years (17 years in Ireland)	B		
B1	Heavy quadricycles	16 years		AM	This class is optional, i.e. it is not implemented by all countries.
Large goods vehicle
C1	Large goods vehicle with a maximum authorised mass of not more than 7.5 tonnes (7.4 long tons; 8.3 short tons); with or without a trailer with a maximum mass of less than 750 kilograms (1,650 lb).	18 years	B		
C1E	Combinations of vehicles where the tractor vehicle is in category C1 and its trailer(s) or semi-trailer(s) have a maximum authorised mass of over 750 kilograms (1,650 lb), and the combined mass of the tractor vehicle and trailer(s) do not exceed 12,000 kilograms (26,000 lb).	18 years	C1	BE	
C	Large goods vehicle with a maximum authorised mass of more than 3.5 tonnes (3.4 long tons; 3.9 short tons) mass and not more than 8 + 1 seats (lorry); with a trailer with a maximum mass of 750 kilograms (1,650 lb).	21 years 18 years in Sweden, Finland and Ireland 18 years in Germany for non-commercial use only except for apprenticeship as professional driver 18 years in Belgium for professional drivers	B for 1 year, not including restricted licence	C1	
CE	Other combinations of vehicles and trailers which with combined maximum authorised mass of more than 750 kilograms (1,650 lb).	21 years (18 years in Belgium for professional drivers)	C	BE, C1E	in the Netherlands, CE gives you automatically DE when already passed D.
Buses
D1	Light buses with a maximum of 16 + 1 seats, maximum length of 8 metres (26 ft).	21 years (18 years in Belgium for professional drivers)	B		Motor vehicles designed and constructed for the carriage of no more than 16 passengers in addition to the driver; motor vehicles in this category may be combined with a trailer having a maximum authorised mass not exceeding 750 kilograms (1,650 lb).
D1E	Combinations of vehicles where the tractor vehicle is in category D1 and its trailer(s) or semi-trailer(s) have a maximum authorised mass of over 750 kilograms (1,650 lb), and the combined mass of the tractor vehicle and trailer(s) do not exceed 12,000 kilograms (26,000 lb).	21 years (18 years in Belgium for professional drivers)	D1		
D	Vehicles with more than 8 + 1 seats (buses).	24 years (21 years in Ireland; 21 years in Belgium for professional drivers)	B (C for 2 years in Bulgaria)	D1	Motor vehicles designed and constructed for the carriage of more than eight passengers in addition to the driver; motor vehicles which may be driven with a category D licence may be combined with a trailer having a maximum authorised mass which does not exceed 750 kilograms (1,650 lb). Includes articulated buses (at least in Germany).
DE	Combinations of vehicles where the tractor vehicle is in category D and its trailer has a maximum authorised mass of over 750 kilograms (1,650 lb).	24 years (21 years in Ireland; 21 years in Belgium for professional drivers)	D	D1E	

== National categories in EEA member states ==
There are other national categories for tractors, large motorcycles, motorised wheel boats, motor tricycles (modern voiturettes, Category B1 or S), and military categories such as for driving tanks. National categories mean they are not harmonised and only valid within the issuing country. The table below gives general descriptions that do not include full details of regulations.

Class	Description	Age of acquisition	Issued by	Valid in	Remarks
Mopeds
LK	Small moped	15	Denmark	Denmark	
Snowmobiles
S	Snowmobile	16	Norway	Norway; Sweden	
Motor vehicles
BF17	Begleitetes Fahren (accompanied driving)	17	Germany	Austria; Germany	BF17 licensed driver must be accompanied by B-licence holder age 30+
L17	L17-Lenkberechtigung	17	Austria	Austria; Germany; Denmark; England; Northern Ireland	
Buses
T	Trolleybus	21	Lithuania	Lithuania	
TR	Trolleybus	20	Hungary	Hungary	
TROL	Trolleybus		Latvia	Latvia	
Tтб	Trolleybus	24	Bulgaria	Bulgaria	Tтб was phased out and incorporated into the D category in 2013. Trolleybus drivers are now required to possess a D licence and to complete additional training on a trolleybus. Entitlement to drive a trolleybus is specified on the driving licence by code 103.
Trams
H	Tram	21	Croatia	Croatia	
TRAM	Tram		Latvia	Latvia	
Tтм	Tram	24	Bulgaria	Bulgaria	
V	Tram	20	Hungary	Hungary	
Tractors
F	Tractor	16	Austria	Austria	
F	Tractor	16	Croatia	Croatia	With or without trailer; included in class B
F	Tractor	16	Slovenia	Slovenia	
T	Tractor	17	Czech Republic	Czech Republic	
T	Tractor	16	Germany	Germany	
T	Tractor	16	Hungary	Hungary	Maximum 2 trailers
T	Tractor	16	Netherlands	Netherlands	Included in class B if acquired before 1 July 2015. Included in C.
T	Tractor	16	Norway	Norway	Included in class BE
T	Tractor	16	Poland	Poland	Included in class BE
T	Tractor	15	Finland	Finland	Included in class A1, A2, A and B
TM	Tractor	16	Denmark	Denmark	
Tкт	Tractor	16	Bulgaria	Bulgaria	
K	Two-wheel tractor	16	Hungary	Hungary	
L	Tractor not exceeding 40 km/h by design	16	Germany	Germany	With trailer: max. 25 km/h; included in class B
Heavy equipment
G	Agricultural vehicles	16	Belgium	Belgium	Included in B, B+E, C1, C1+E, C, C+E (only for agricultural vehicles with the same maximum authorised mass as the vehicles one has a licence for)
G	Heavy equipment	16	Croatia	Croatia	Included in class B
W	Work Vehicle	16	Ireland	Ireland	Includes land tractors with or without a trailer

== Overview of driving licences ==
Member state	Front	Reverse	Validity	Issuing authority	Latest version	Mobile driving licence
Austria			15 years		11 Feb 2014	Yes
Belgium			10 years	Federal Public Service Mobility and Transport	27 Dec 2019	
Bulgaria	Link to image	Link to image	5 years for categories C1, C, CE, D1, D1E, D, DE; 10 years for categories AM, A1, A2, A, B, B1	Ministry of Interior	19 Jan 2013	
Croatia			5 years for categories C1, C1E, C, CE, D1, D1E, D, DE, H; 10 years for categories AM, A1, A2, A, B, BE, F, G		18 Dec 2023	
Cyprus	Link to image	Link to Image	5 years for categories C, CΕ, D, DΕ, D1, D1Ε, H, Θ, Ζ; 15 years for categories A, A1, A2, B, B1, BE, C1, C1Ε, ΣT, ΙΒ		1 July 2013	
Czech Republic	Link to image				19 Jan 2013	
Denmark			15 years		1 Sep 2017	Yes, proprietary app, launched in Nov 2020
Estonia	Link to image	Link to image	5 years for categories C, D; 10 years for other categories		19 Jan 2013	
Finland			Depending on the licence category, valid for 2 to 15 years	Traficom	1 April 2019	Terminated trial, proprietary app, from 2018-2020.
Åland (Finland)	Link to image	Link to image	Depending on the licence category, valid for 2 to 15 years	Åland Provincial Government	1 April 2019	Terminated trial, proprietary app, from 2018-2020.
France			1–5 years (depending on age for the required medical checkup) for categories C1, C, C1E, CE, D1, D, D1E, DE and for some professional use of category A, B; 15 years for categories AM, A1, A2, A, B1, B, BE	Prefecture via the ANTS	1 July 2015	
Collectivity of Saint Martin (France)				Collectivity of Saint Martin	March 2015	
Germany			15 years	Local driving license authority	4 Jan 2021	Yes, proprietary app, launched in 2022. Supplementary to the physical driver's license without legal validity.
Greece			For Category B and other non-professional categories: 15 years up to age 65; 3 years from age 65 up to age 80; 2 years above age 80; For professional categories C1, C1E, C, CE, D1, D1E, D and DE (With medical checkup): 5 years up to age 65; 3 years from age 65 up to age 80; 2 years above age 80	Ministry of Infrastructure and Transport	4 July 2023	Yes, proprietary app launched in July 2023.
Hungary	Link to image	Link to image	10 years until age 50; 5 years at age 50 60; 3 years at age 60 70; 2 years above age 70		19 Jan 2013	
Iceland			3 years (first licence); 15 years until age 70; 4 years at age 70; 3 years at age 71; 2 years at age 72–79; 1 year above age 80	Sheriffs, on behalf of the Icelandic Transport Authority	3 June 2013	Yes, using proprietary .pkpass implementation, launched in July 2020.
(Republic of Ireland); Ireland	Link to image	Link to image	10 years	Road Safety Authority	28 Feb 2017	
Italy			Category AM, A1, A2, A, B1, B and BE driving licences are valid for ten years; 5 years : When issued or renewed for holders aged between 50 and 69; 3 years : For holders aged over 70	Ministry of Infrastructure and Transport	19 Jan 2013	Yes, proprietary app
Latvia	Link to image	Link to image	5 years for categories C1, C1E, D1, D1E, C, CE, D, DE; 10 years for other categories	Road Safety Directorate	2 Jan 2013	
(Liechtenstein); Liechtenstein	Link to image	Link to image			1 April 2019	
Lithuania	Link to image	Link to image	10 years		30 July 2021	
(Luxembourg); Luxembourg		Link to image			19 Jan 2013	
Malta	Link to image	Link to image			19 Dec 2003	
(Netherlands); Netherlands	Link to image	Link to image	10 years until age 65; Until age 75 if renewed between age 65–70; 5 years at age 71	RDW	14 Nov 2014	
Norway			15 years	Norwegian Public Roads Administration	1 March 2023	Yes, proprietary app, launched in October 2019.
Poland			15 years	Starosta or prezydent miasta (city mayor)	4 March 2019	
Portugal	Link to image	Link to image		Instituto da Mobilidade e dos Transportes (IMT)	2 Jan 2013	
Romania			5 years for categories C1, C1E, C, CE, D1, D1E, D, DE, (Tb), (Tv), (Tr); 10 years categories AM, A1, A, B, B1, B, BE		19 Jan 2013	
Slovakia			15 years for categories AM, A1, A2, A, B1, B, BE, T; 5 years for categories C1, C1E, C, CE, D1, D1E, D, DE		1 Dec 2024	Yes, since April 2025
Slovenia	Link to image	Link to image			19 Jan 2013	
Spain	Link to image	Link to image	10 years until the age of 65; 5 years over the age of 65	Directorate-General for Traffic	19 Jan 2013	
Sweden	Link to image	Link to image	10 years; 5 years for C1, C1E, C, CE, D1, D1E, D, DE	Swedish Transport Agency	21 Jan 2016	

== See also ==
- European digital driving licence
- Driving licence
- European Commissioner for Transport
- European Health Insurance Card
- Driving licence in the Turkish Republic of Northern Cyprus
- National identity cards in the European Economic Area and Switzerland
- Passports of the European Union
- International Driving Permit
- European vehicle registration plate
- Prawo Jazdy (alleged criminal) - supposed Polish national with numerous traffic violations in Ireland, construed from misreading the Polish driver's licence
