= Driving licence in Iceland =

Driving licence in Iceland Ökuskírteini
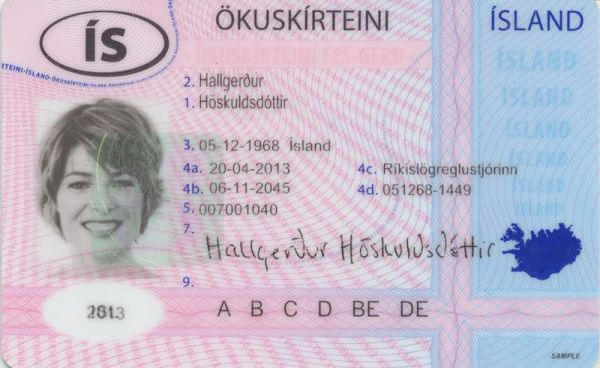
- An example of a driving licence from 2013 (front)

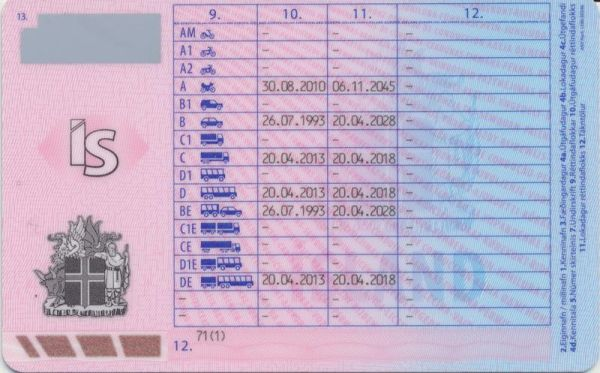
- An example of a driving licence from 2013 (back)
- Type: Driving licence
- Issued by: Iceland
- First issued: 29 August 1914 (first version) 12 April 1960 (first photo version); 15 October 2001 (ID-1 format version); 3 June 2013 (current version) 1 July 2020 (digital version)
- In circulation: 260,000 (physical version); 133,000 (digital version)
- Purpose: Identification
- Valid in: Iceland; Europe
- Expiration: 15 years until age 70 4 years at age 70; 3 years at age 71; 2 years at age 72-79 1 year above age 80
- Cost: 8,600 ISK (general); 1,800 ISK (renewals aged 65 and older)
- Size: ID-1

In Iceland, a driving licence (Icelandic: Ökuskírteini) is a permit issued by the Icelandic Transport Authority authorizing its holder to operate a motorized vehicle. The design conforms to the European driving licence style, and is valid in all countries in the European Economic Area, as well as many others outside Europe. In Iceland the driving age is 17, and 16 is the minimum age to obtain a learner's permit. They are issued in physical form, with an optional digital version also being issued for smartphones. In 2022, 91% of Icelanders had a driving licence.

Icelandic driving licence holders can be issued a 1949 International Driving Permit as Iceland is a party to the 1949 Geneva Convention on Road Traffic. However, Iceland is not party to the 1968 Vienna Convention on Road Traffic.

== Issue ==
At the age of 16, those who are resident in Iceland (as per the national registry) may apply for a learner's permit (Icelandic: Námsheimild) and begin driver's eductation. Driver's eductation consists of both a 2 theoretical courses (Icelandic: Ökuskóli 1+2), a practical course (Icelandic: Ökuskóli 3) along with a minimum of 17 driving lessons with a licensed driving instructor. Driving under supervision of an eligible adult is permitted with a learner's permit. After completing the three courses and driving lessons, a theoretical test is taken and finally a practical driving test.

The first issue of a driving licence is only valid for three years (probation period). After one year, it can be renewed to the standard 15 year validity, provided there are no penalty points on the licence, following a short driving evaluation by a driving instructor. The licence is then valid until 70 years of age, but the photocard must be renewed every 15 years. Licences are issued by the sheriff, with regulations administered by the Icelandic Transport Authority.

A standard licence holder (category B) is entitled to drive a vehicle up to 3,500kg with 8 passengers. Licences for other categories (see below) including heavier vehicles and buses, are subject to further education and testing.

At 70 years of age the licence can only be renewed for 4 years, following a short driving evaluation and a valid medical certificate. This is then shortened to 3 years at age 71, 2 years at age 72-79 and annually from age 80.

== Points and suspension ==
Penalty points are awarded for traffic offences for example, speeding or running a red light. 1 to 4 points can be awarded depending on the seriousness of the offence. If a driver receives 12 points in a three-year period, they have their licence suspended for 3 months. Penalty points expire after 3 years. Licences can be suspended for longer periods (or indefinitely) for the most serious offences.

Fines are also issued for traffic offences, often along with penalty points, up to 500,000 ISK. Drivers in Iceland must carry their driving licence when driving and can be fined if they do not present a valid licence.

== Digital driving licences ==
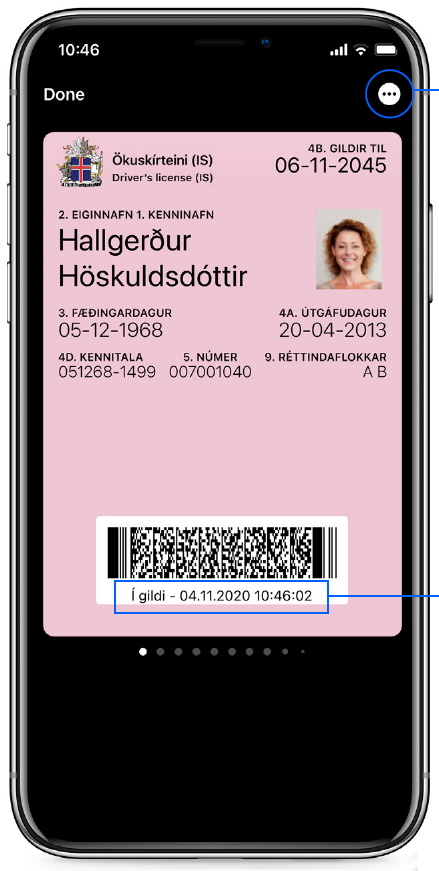
Digital driving licence, issued from 2020.

In July 2020, a digital version of the driving licence was released, through island.is, the government's central digital service, one of the first countries to do so. Licence holders can obtain a digital version of their licence using the island.is app using their electronic ID (Icelandic: rafræn skilríki). Digital driving licences display the same information as a physical licence along with a live barcode acting as a verification. Any user can also use the same app to verify other licence barcodes (e.g. for proof of age).

Originally, the digital driving licence was issued as a .pkpass file, and was loaded directly into the Wallet app on iPhone or a third-party app on Android (e.g. Smartwallet). In 2022, licences began to be transitioned to a separate island.is app, as the digital licences were being falsified. In 2025, the .pkpass implementation was disabled and licences can only be accessed by the app.

By January 2021, 35% of all drivers were using the digital licence, rising to 60% in August 2022.

The digital drivers licence is only valid in Iceland, as it does not have internationally accepted security features.

== History ==
The first driving licences were issued in 1914 with the introduction of the laws on the use of automobiles with licences being to persons over the age of 21 issued by police following a driving test. In 1926 new laws dictated that drunk driving was banned. At the same time, speed limits were increased from 12 to 18km/h in towns, and 35 to 40km/h in open country. Licences were renewed every 5 years. Photographs were included at a later date, at least by the 1940s. The driving age was decreased to 17 years at some point before 1960.

In 1960 new style driving licences were issued, printed on a laminated green paper card. This was replaced by a pink background in 1981. In 1997 a new plastic card in an ID-1 (credit card size) format was introduced, compliant with European regulations. Driving licences were updated in 2001 with more durable and secure printing processes, manufactured by Bundesbruckerei in Germany.

In 2010 a new practical driving course, Ökuskóli 3, was added to the driver's education requirements, consisting of an ice-driving course, stopping distance awareness and other practical elements.

In 2013, to comply with new standardized European driving licence regulations, an updated version of the card was released with improved security features, with manufacturing and personalisation handled by ANY Security Printing Company of Hungary. Older versions, including paper licences dating back to 1960, will continue to be valid until 2032, although most will renew them earlier.

Until 2017, driving lessons and final tests had to be conducted using a manual transmission car. This was changed with a new category (indicated by restriction code 78) allowing automatic transmission only licences to be issued.

From February 2025, the personalisation of cards has been processed locally along with a new supplier, shortening processing times. During the introduction period, there were significant delays in processing. The design of the cards remains the same, apart from minor differences.

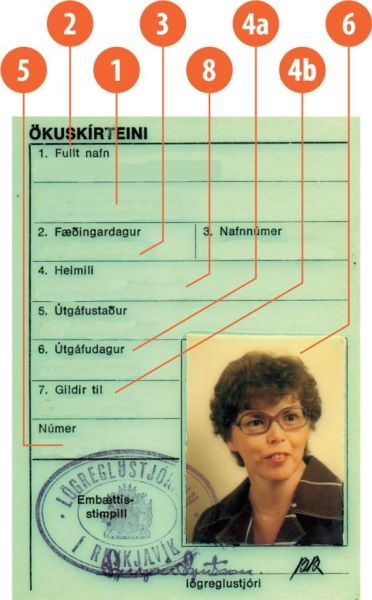
A 1960 series driving licence

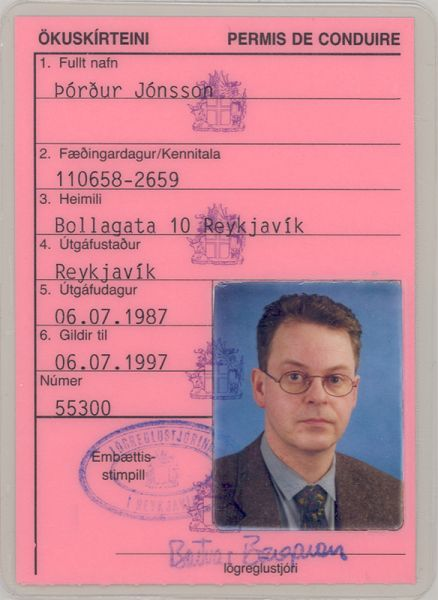
A 1981 series driving licence

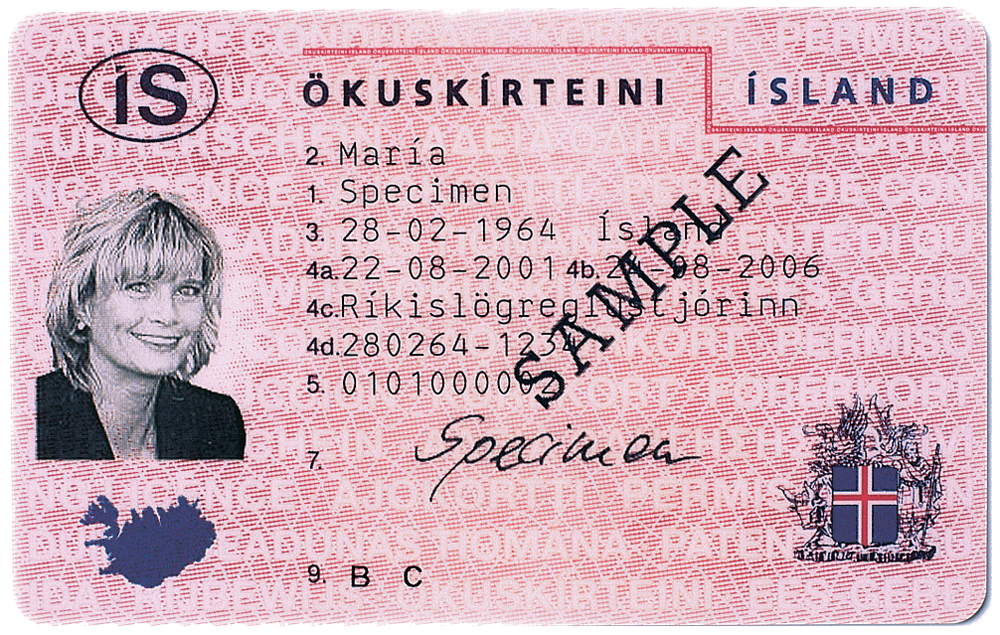
A 2001 series driving licence

== Categories ==
Iceland uses the same categories as other EEA states, although local laws regarding which vehicles they include may differ slightly from other jurisdictions. Each category covers both manual and automatic transmission vehicles, although after 2017 a new category of licence (marked by restriction 78), only allows operation of an automatic transmission vehicle.

| Category | Description | Remarks |
|---|---|---|
| AM | Moped | |
| A1 | Light motorcycle | Includes AM. |
| A2 | Motorcycle | Includes AM, A1, snowmobiles and four-wheelers. |
| A | Heavy motorcycle | Includes AM, A1, A2, snowmobiles, four- and three-wheelers. |
| B1 | Quadricycle | Not used. |
| B | Car | Includes AM, B1, T, snowmobiles, four- and three-wheelers. |
| BE | Car with heavy trailer | |
| C1 | Goods truck | |
| C1E | Goods truck with heavy trailer | |
| C | Heavy goods truck | |
| CE | Heavy goods truck with heavy trailer | |
| D1 | Light bus | |
| D1E | Light bus with heavy trailer | |
| D | Bus | |
| DE | Bus with heavy trailer | |
| T | Tractor | |

== See also ==
- European driving licence
- Vehicle registration plates of Iceland
- Road signs in Iceland
- Icelandic identity card
