= European digital driving licence =

Digital version of the EU driving licence

The European digital driving licence is a project for a standardised digital driving licence, stored on digital devices like smartphones and valid throughout the European Union and other participating countries.

== History ==
Directive 2025/2205
- European Union directive
- Text with EEA relevance
- Title: Directive (EU) 2025/2205 of the European Parliament and of the Council of 22 October 2025 on driving licences, amending Regulation (EU) 2018/1724 of the European Parliament and of the Council and Directive (EU) 2022/2561 of the European Parliament and of the Council, and repealing Directive 2006/126/EC of the European Parliament and of the Council and Commission Regulation (EU) No 383/2012
- Made by: European Parliament and Council of the European Union
- Made under: Art. 91(1) TFEU
- Journal reference: OJ L, 2025/2205

History
- European Parliament vote: 21 October 2025
- Council Vote: 2 October 2025
- Date made: 22 October 2025
- Entry into force: 25 November 2025
- Implementation date: 26 November 2028
- Applies from: 26 November 2029

Preparative texts
- Commission proposal: 1 March 2023

Other legislation
- Replaces: Directive 2006/126/EC of the European Parliament and of the Council

On 21 October 2025, the European Parliament approved the creation of a European digital driving licence with the adoption of Directive (EU) 2025/2205 (also unofficially called the 4th European Driving Licence Directive), according to the internationally recognized ISO standard (ISO/IEC 18013-5) and compatible with the upcoming EU Digital Identity Wallet (EUDI) in accordance with eIDAS 2.0. This is a standardised European digital driving licence.

=== Preceding digital (mobile) driving licence implementations ===
In July 2019, Norway was the first EU/EEA country to issue a mobile version of its driving licence using a proprietary app on a nationwide basis. This was preceded by limited trial in Finland from 2018-2020. Since then, mobile driving licences have been available in Austria, Denmark, France, Greece, Iceland, Poland, Portugal and Spain. These digital/mobile driving licences all have proprietary implementations and are not valid outside their issuing country, as they are not compliant with the current European driving licence rules before the changes of 2025 come into force.
