= Anne-Marijke Podt =

Dutch politician (born 1975)

- Podt in 2026

Member of the House of Representatives
- Incumbent
- Assumed office 7 September 2021
- Preceded by: Steven van Weyenberg

Member of the Utrecht municipal council
- In office 27 March 2014 – 16 September 2021
- Succeeded by: Andrea Naphegyi

Personal details
- Born: 16 January 1975 (age 51) Papendrecht, Netherlands
- Party: Democrats 66
- Children: 1
- Education: Delft University of Technology
- Occupation: Politician; independent adviser; aid worker
- Website: annemarijkepodt.nl

Anne-Marijke Podt (born 16 January 1975) is a Dutch politician of the social liberal party Democrats 66 (D66), who has been serving as a member of the House of Representatives since September 2021. She had previously been a member of the Utrecht municipal council starting in 2014, and she has worked as an aid worker and as an independent adviser for municipalities.

== Early life and career ==
Podt was born and raised in the South Holland town of Papendrecht and lived in its Molenwijk neighborhood. Her father was the manager of a factory of plastic products that her grandfather had founded. Podt attended the secondary school De Lage Waard and graduated in 1994 with an atheneum diploma. She subsequently studied industrial design engineering at Delft University of Technology for eight years, including one year as a full-time board member of a student association, and did an internship in Nicaragua. During the last three years of her study, Podt worked as a partner and trainer for a company called PinguinXL.

After graduating, she became a project manager at the traffic innovation department of CBR, which is responsible for driving licenses in the Netherlands. She then took a job in 2005 at the non-profit International Institute for Communication and Development (IICD) as a monitoring and evaluation expert and filled that position for five years. For the last three of those years, she also served as an ICT and democratization coordinator for the organization's Ecuador operations. Podt became the IICD's Kenya country manager in 2011. She left the foundation in 2014 to work as a freelance social adviser for municipalities under the name A Single Step.

While a freelancer, she held positions as an advisory board member of Utrecht University's InclUUsion refugee program (2016) and as chair of the supervisory board of ActionAid Netherlands (2018–21).

== Politics ==
Podt ran for the Utrecht municipal council in 2014 and was elected as D66's seventh candidate. She had previously chaired D66's International Affairs/International Cooperation thematic department in the years 2010–12. In the council, Podt's specialties were youth, welfare, public health, diversity, social shelters, and addiction treatment. In 2016, she proposed a pilot to immediately give a house to 200 news refugees who have yet to receive a residence permit and to start their integration process. The plan did not receive enough support from the council. She also successfully pled for unisex toilets in municipal buildings in 2016 to make them more attractive for transgender people, making Utrecht the first municipality in the Netherlands to have them in its city hall. Podt was re-elected in 2018, being placed second on D66's party list, and became her party's vice caucus chair. Her specialties changed to work, income, LGBTI, refugees, integration, social shelters, and addiction treatment.

Podt participated in the March 2021 general election as D66's 26th candidate. She received 3,919 preference votes and was not elected, as her party won 24 seats. Following the resignation of D66 member of parliament Steven van Weyenberg, Podt was sworn into the House of Representatives on 7 September 2021. Van Weyenberg had stepped down due to his new cabinet position. Podt left the Utrecht municipal council and serves in the House as D66's spokesperson for refugees, migration, the Participation Act, migrant workers, labor conditions, integration, sex work, and human trafficking. In the House, Podt advocated allowing migrant workers into the Netherlands to mitigate personnel shortages. She also wrote a policy proposal to mostly remove labor restrictions for asylum seekers. These limited migrants from being employed within half a year of their arrival and from working more than 24 weeks per year afterwards. Under Podt's proposal, asylum seekers would have to wait only one month after their arrival to apply for jobs, and the yearly limit would be removed. A judge later called the labor restrictions unlawful, but the cabinet appealed the decision. During a debate on Podt's proposal in May 2023, Minister for Migration Eric van der Burg (VVD) opposed the plans, saying there are more pressing issues related to an increased migrant influx to focus on.

She was re-elected in November 2023, and her portfolio changed to migration, labor, purchasing power, agriculture, nature, food, childcare, sex work, and human trafficking.

=== House committee assignments ===
==== 2021–2023 term ====
- Committee for Agriculture, Nature and Food Quality (vice chair)
- Committee for Education, Culture and Science
- Committee for Finance
- Committee for Justice and Security
- Committee for Social Affairs and Employment

==== 2023–present term ====
- Committee for Foreign Affairs
- Committee for Asylum and Migration
- Committee for Agriculture, Fisheries, Food Security and Nature

== Personal life ==
Podt has been living in the city of Utrecht since the second half of the 2000s. She has a boyfriend and a daughter.

== Electoral history ==
Electoral history of Anne-Marijke Podt
Year	Body	Party	Pos.	Votes	Result		Ref.
Year	Body	Party	Pos.	Votes	Party seats	Individual	Ref.
2014	Utrecht Municipal Council	Democrats 66	7	1,999	13	Won	
2018	Utrecht Municipal Council	Democrats 66	2	8,864	10	Won	
2021	House of Representatives	Democrats 66	26	3,919	24	Lost (Note: Podt was appointed to the body later during the term due to a vacancy.)	
2023	House of Representatives	Democrats 66	4	64,426	9	Won	
2025	House of Representatives	Democrats 66	4	147,553	26	Won	
