= Driving licence in Romania =

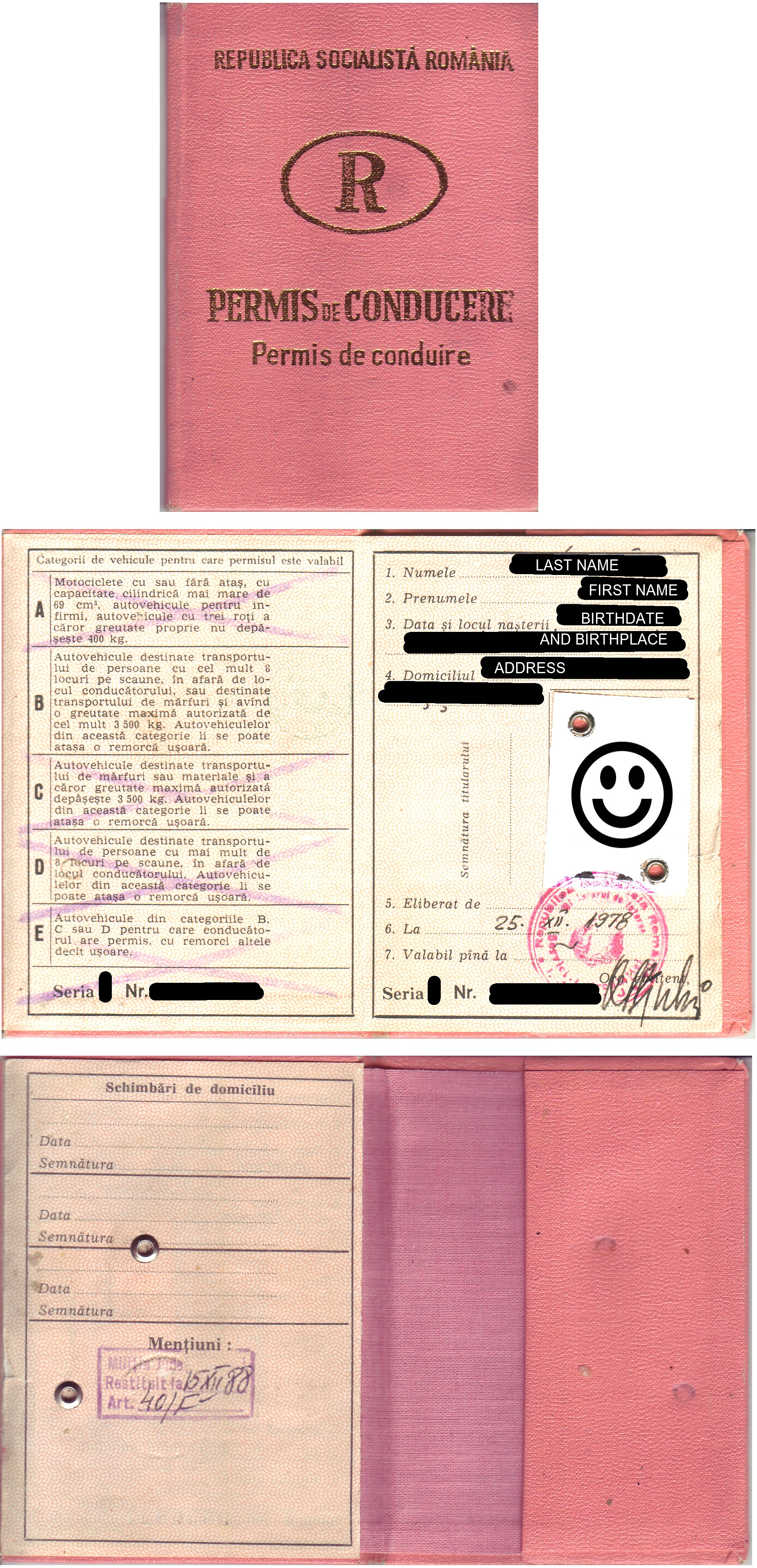
Cover, first, and last pages of the Romanian driver's licence between the 1970s and the 1990s. The R code indicates an issuing before 1981.

In Romania, the driving licence (Romanian: Permis de conducere) is a governmental right given to those who request a licence for any of the categories they desire. It is required for every type of motorized vehicle. The minimum age to obtain a driving licence is 18 years. Regardless of age, in the first year after obtaining the licence the driver is called a beginner (Romanian: începător) and has to display on the windscreen and the back window of the car the distinctive sign (a black exclamation mark (!) on a yellow disk).

Beginning with 1999, the driving licence format was changed from that of a pink booklet to a credit-card sized card.

== Procedure ==
People wanting to obtain a driving licence in Romania must, firstly, attend a number of classes in a traffic law school before beginning the actual practice. At the end of the classes, the candidate is tested, and after the test is passed, the candidate is able to proceed with the driving practice.

The Romanian law fixes the required number of driving classes, a class lasting approximately two hours, at 15. The driving instructor is required to teach the student each maneuver and assure they are capable of properly driving a car. After the 15 driving classes, the candidate proceeds to the theory test. The candidate may, if needed, take additional classes.

=== Theory test ===
The theory test is a questionnaire composed of 26 questions, each with three possible variants. The candidate must answer to all of them, and depending on the question, one, two or all the variants may be right. Partial answers also count as wrong, and the test is automatically failed shall the candidate answer wrongly to five questions. Thus, the minimum passing score is 22 out of 26, or approximately 85% correct answers.

Before the actual test, the candidate is photographed, the pictures being used to identify the candidate. One of the same picture is printed on the driving licence as well.

=== Driving test ===
After the candidate passes the theory test, they move on to the driving test. The driving test is taken in the same city and using the same car the candidate took its driving classes. A police officer is in the teacher's seat, while the candidate is driving, and a so-called "witness" is in the backseat to ensure all parties acted lawfully during the examination. Since July of 2017, the exam is also recorded, and shall the student fail, they have the right to demand the recording and contest the decision.

During the test, the candidate follows a path the police officer tells them to follow. Any mistake is pointed, the lowest amount of points a mistake may be graded being three, and the highest being 21, which is also the number of points necessary to fail the exam, thus the candidate automatically failing the exam. The driving test last at least 25 and at most 45 minutes.

Shall the candidate pass the exam, they receive their driving licence via mail in the following days of the exam. Shall the candidate fail the exam, they are rescheduled but must take an additional six more hours of practice, or three classes.

It is estimated only around 35% pass the exam first try at a national level. Additionally, out of the counties with the best passing rate first try, Botoșani leads the ranking, with approximately 51,5% passing rate, while on the opposite, Timiș is at the bottom, with 25,5%.

== Categories ==
- A -Vehicle with two wheels (motorcycle) with or without a sidecar or a tricycle that has an engine power over 15 kW.
  - AM -Vehicle with two or three wheels having a minimum construction speed of 25 km/h and a maximum speed of 45 km/h, maximum engine capacity of 50CC, or an electric engine with nominal continuous power not exceeding 4 kW, and a mass not exceeding 350 kg, the mass of batteries is not included, in case of electric engine.
  - A1 -Vehicle with two or three wheels having a maximum engine capacity of 125CC, the maximum engine power of 11 kW and the power/weight ratio must not exceed 0.1 kW/kg.
  - A2 -Motorcycle with maximum engine power of 35 kW, with the power/weight ratio not exceeding 0.2 Kw/kg and are not derived from a vehicle that has more than double of its power.
- B -Vehicle that does not exceed a 3,500 kg authorized mass, has a maximum of 8 seats besides the driver's and is allowed to pull a light-weight trailer not exceeding an authorized mass of 750 kg.
  - B1 -Vehicle with three or four wheels having a minimum mass of 400 kg and a maximum mass of 550 kg that has an engine larger than 50CC and can achieve a speed greater than 50 km/h.
  - B+E -A B category vehicle that has a trailer with an authorized mass greater than 750 kg but not exceeding the mass of the pulling vehicle.
- C -Vehicle with and authorized mass greater than 3,500 kg and with 8 seats besides the driver's.
  - C1 -Vehicle that has a mass greater than 3,500 kg but not exceeding 7,500 kg.
  - C1+E -A C1 category vehicle that has a trailer exceeding 750 kg but the summed mass of the vehicle and trailer does not exceed 12,000 kg.
  - C+E -A C category vehicle that is allowed to pull a trailer with an authorized mass greater than 750 kg but not exceeding the mass of the pulling vehicle.
- D -Vehicle that has more than 8 seats besides the driver's.
  - D1 -Vehicle that has more than 8 seats besides the driver's but not more than 16 seats.
  - D1+E -A D1 category vehicle with a trailer exceeding 750 kg but the summed mass of the vehicle and trailer not exceeding 12,000 kg.
  - D+E -A D category vehicle with a trailer exceeding a 750 kg mass but the trailer must not be used for people transport.
- Tr -Tractors and self-propelled working vehicles.
- Tb -Trolleybuses
- TV -Trams

== Age requirement ==
Every category has a minimum age required for obtaining it:

- AM -16 or over
- A -24 (20 if the candidate has at least 2 years experience with A2)
  - A1 -16
  - A2 -18
- B -18
  - B1 -16
- C -21
- D -24
- Tr -18
- Tb -24
- TV -24

== Gallery ==
Beginning with 2009, the driving licence respects the EU format without any English translations anymore which may confuse many non-Romanian language speakers or non-EU residents.

Note
In Romania driving licence document number first and last alpha match to place of issue (abr) of document.
e.g.: place of ISSUE- TIMISOARA,TM

doc no.-T00406400M

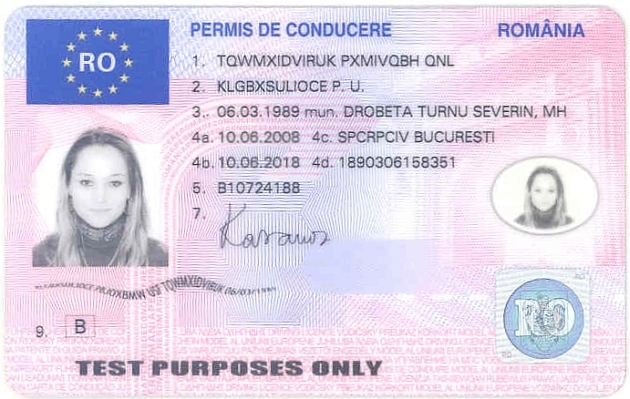
The front (2009-18.01.2013 model)

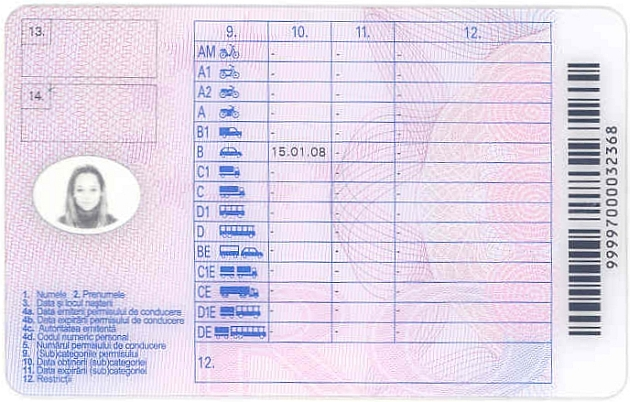
The back (2009-18.01.2013 model)

== See also ==
- European driving licence
