= Driving licence in Croatia =

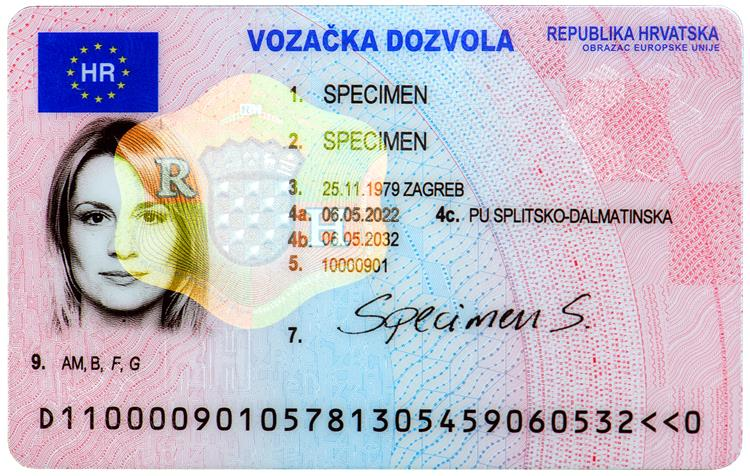
- Front

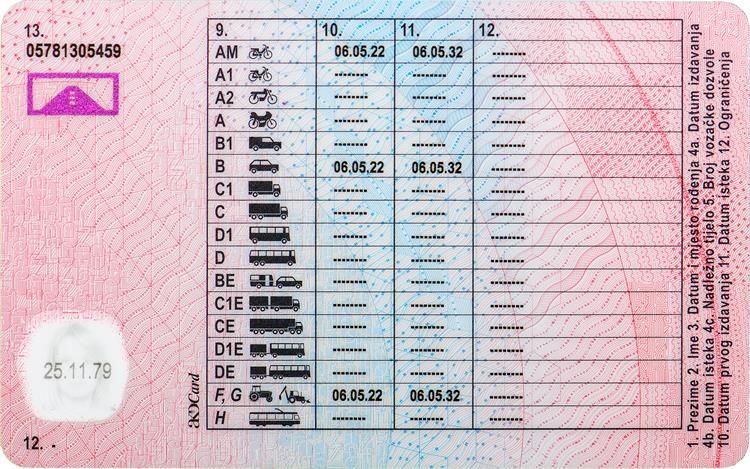
- Back
- Type: Driving licence
- Issued by: Croatia
- Purpose: Proof of permission to legally operate a motor vehicle
- Valid in: Croatia; Europe
- Cost: 20,04 €

In Croatia, the driving licence (Croatian: vozačka dozvola) is a type of licence granted by the government to citizens who request it, provided they satisfy certain requirements. The licence permits holders to drive motorised vehicles on public roads.

Until 2013, the Croatian driving licence had a pink booklet format, which was common in Europe at the time. A separate booklet was required for each vehicle category endorsement. This was before the European Parliament adopted the Directive 2006/126/EC of the European Commission, which mandated the creation of a single European driving licence. Since 2013, Croatian driving licences are issued in an EU-standard, credit-card-style format. Only one card is required per licence holder as it contains information on all vehicle categories that the holder is allowed to operate. Old (pre-2013) licences remain to be valid until their expiry, or until year 2033, whichever comes sooner.

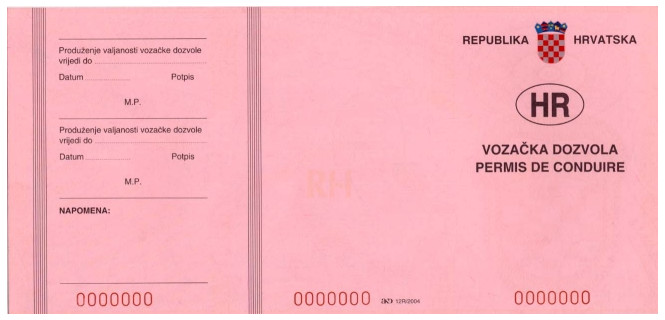
Pre-July 2013 Croatian driving licence

The licence for any category can be obtained after finishing driving school and passing a two-stage test, the theory test and the road test, which test the prospective driver's knowledge of the rules of the road including the speed limits in Croatia.

The minimum age to obtain a Croatian driving licence varies; for cars, it is 18 years, but the young drivers are only allowed to drive under a stricter regime until the age of 24; for some motorcycles it is 24, or 20 after two years of probation with another motorcycle licence. Young motorcycle riders in order to obtain an A1 motorcycle licence need to be of the minimum age requirement of 16 in Croatia; for that licence the motorcycle must be 125cc.

== See also ==
- European driving licence
- Vehicle registration plates of Croatia
- Croatian identity card
- Croatian passport
