= Driving licence in Denmark =

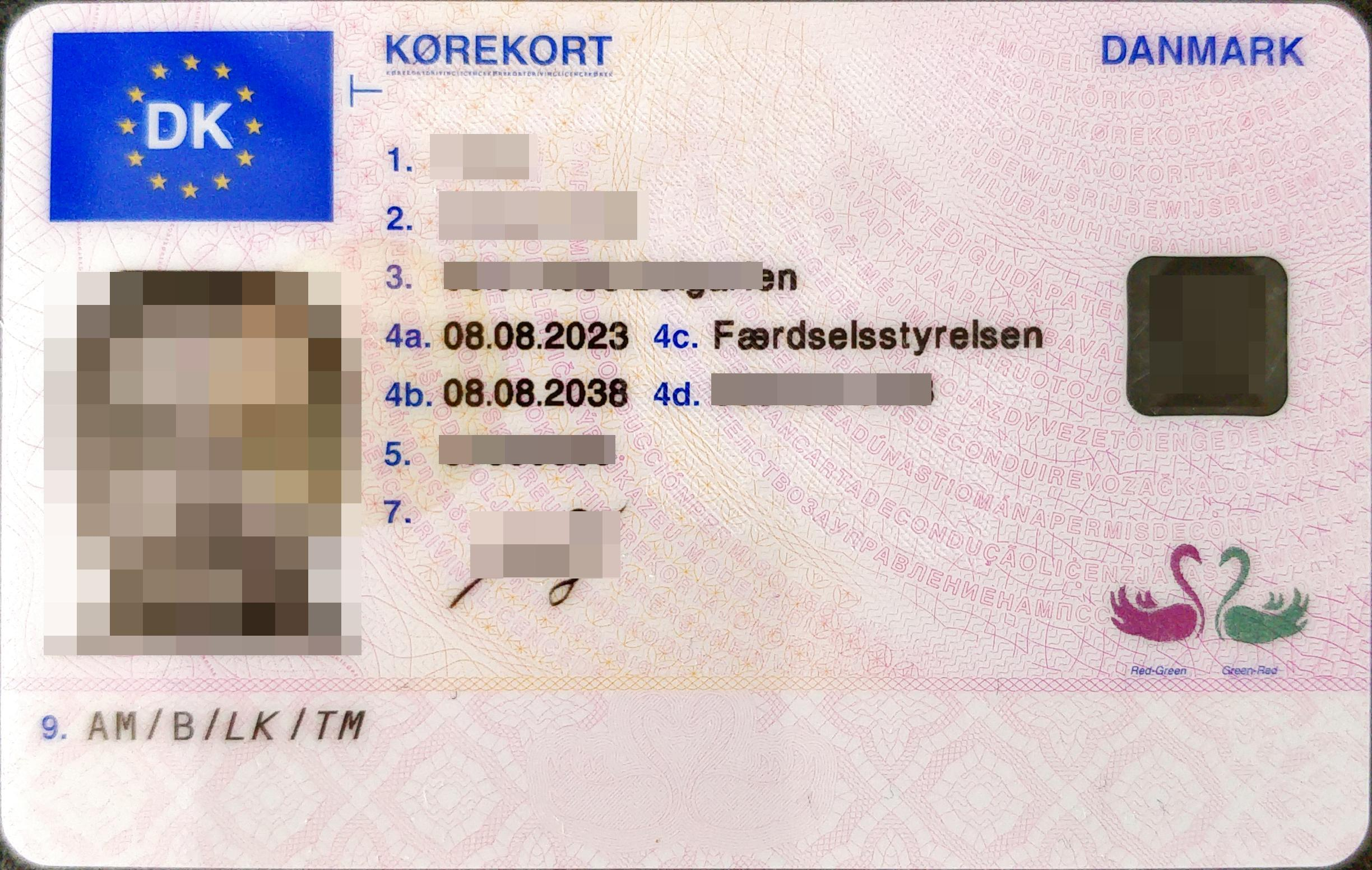

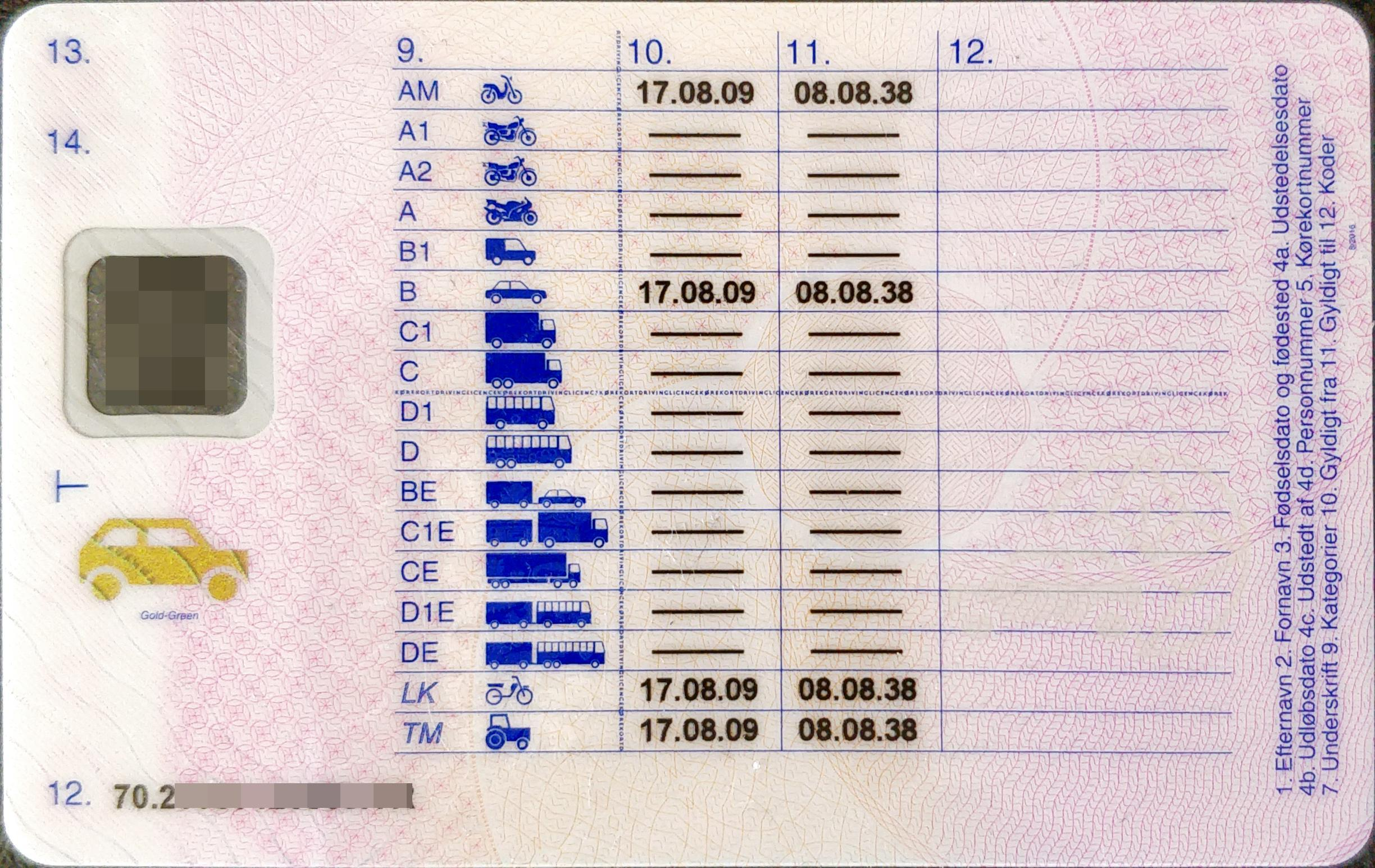
A current Danish driving licence

Denmark does not use the C1 and D1 categories. This means a truck (C) or a bus (D) licence covers all trucks or buses, respectively, that are not covered by the car (B) licence. A B/E licence only allows heavy trailers on cars, even if the driver has a C or D permit.

Tractor/Motorized equipment (T/M) permit can be obtained when the driver is 16 years old. Anyone with B licence can drive tractors and Motorized equipment. Motorized equipment would be things like combine harvesters, steam rollers, loaders, excavators and other vehicles driving maximum 30km/h.

A moped licence can also be acquired when the driver is 15 years old and requires the driver to pay a fee of usually 510 DKK for 30 hours of classroom education. The driver is also required to take part in a theoretical test as well as driving on a track and ultimately on public roads. It is considered very hard to fail the moped driving test. A valid moped driving licence grants the driver permission to drive mopeds limited to 30km/h, but it does not grant the driver permission to drive T/M vehicles. Anyone above the age of 18 can drive a moped limited to 30km/h with, or without a licence. Anyone with a B licence are allowed to drive mopeds that are limited to 45km/h. A moped licence is not recognised as a valid means of identification, which is also made clear on the rear side of the licence itself.

A Car (B) licence requires the driver to be 17 years of age, although the driver can begin the education 3 months prior to their 17th birthday. A 17-year-old driver must have a supervisor sitting next to them at all times (this is not required once the driver turns 18). Unlike many countries, the 17-year-old driver has to pass all tests, before driving with a supervisor. There are a number of requirements that has to be fulfilled to be a supervisor. These requirements are: the supervisor has to be at least 30 years old, they have to have had a drivers licence for at least 10 years; their driver licence cannot have been revoked in those 10 years; they have to be able to take over the driving at all times, and they have to sit next to the 17-year-old.

Education consists of a set number of hours in a classroom, a driving course on a closed track, another driving course designed to simulate iced roads, as well as a set number of hours on public roads. All exercises are supervised by a specially-educated driver's teacher, and it is their decision if the driver can be forwarded to the final tests. Before the finals tests can be taken, the students must have fulfilled some requirements: the students must have obtained a certificate, that shows that they have been through an approximately 8 hour first-aid course. The students must also have obtained a doctor's note, where they examine the overall health of the student and their eyes.

The first of the final tests consists of a multiple choice test regarding different scenarios that the driver will be likely to meet on the public roads. The driver is allowed to make a maximum of five mistakes on this test out of 25 questions in total. The second test consists of the driver driving on a route set by a government supervisor, who also supervises the driver. This test is considered especially difficult in the larger cities and the failure statistics show similar results. This test demands perfection as the driver is not allowed to make any mistakes at all.

In Denmark, the B licence is valid until the driver reaches 70 years of age, although further driving tests combined with medical examinations allows the driver to retake their licence every two years after the age of 70.

Driving forklifts requires a special forklift certificate, although there are exceptions to this for smaller forklifts.

Carrying hazardous goods requires an ADR permit.

Commercial passenger traffic (route bus, tourist bus, taxi) requires a 5-year commercial driver's licence.

Some severe driving offences will incur a strike on one's licence. This is logged in a central police database, and if one exceeds the maximum number of strikes, the licence is lost, but can ultimately be reacquired. The maximum number of strikes are two, for those who've held their licence for fewer than three years, and three for everybody else.

== Categories ==
Displayed as if you take every category after 1.may.2009* Not Completed
Type	Categories	Picture	Minimum age	Years Valid at obtaining the licence	Weight	Max persons. with driver	Max length	Max Speed	Valid in	Misc.	Automatically gets when taking this category
Big Moped	AM		18	15 (until 75 years old)				45 km/h			
Small Motorcycle	A1		18	15 (until 75 years old)				100 km/h			
Medium Big Motorcycle	A2		20 (18 in military)	15 (until 75 years old)							
Big Motorcycle	A		24 (21 in military)	15 (until 75 years old)							A1, A2
3 wheel small Motorcycle and Quads (ATV)	B1		16	15 (until 75 years old)						Requires a recognized disability	
Car and Van	B		18(17)*	15 (until 75 years old)	car max 3500 kg trailer at max 750 kg	9				*17, with an experienced driver holding a driving licence for at least 10 years, in the front seat.	AM, B1, LK, TM
Small Truck	C1		18	5 (until 70 years old)	above 3.500 kg but max.7.500 kg	9		80 km/h			
Big Truck	C		21 (18 in military)	5 (until 70 years old)		9		80 km/h			
Small bus	D1		21	5 (until 70 years old)	bus max 3500 kg trailer at max 750 kg	17	8 m				
Big Bus	D		24 (21 in military)	5 (until 70 years old)							
Car with Trailer over 750 kg	BE		18	15 (until 75 years old)	car max 3.500 kg trailer max 3.500 kg	9	trailer max 12m Combined max 18,75m	80 km/h (100 km/h*)		*100 km/h if the trailer and car are approved periodical survey together Requires Cat. B	
Small Truck with Trailer over 750 kg	C1E		18	5 (until 70 years old)	Small truck max 7.500 kg trailer max 3.500 kg	9		80 km/h			
Big Truck with Trailer over 750 kg	CE		21 (18 in military)	5 (until 70 years old)		9		80 km/h			
Small Bus with Trailer over 750 kg	D1E		21	5 (until 70 years old)	Small Bus max 3.500 kg trailer max 3.500 kg	17					
Big bus with Trailer over 750 kg	DE		24 (21 in military)	5 (until 70 years old)							
Small Moped	LK		15			1		30 km/h			
Tractor and Work vehicles	TM		16							Tractor and Harvesters and such Work vehicles like diggers and telehanders and trucks limited to 30 km/h	

- Sources: https://www.retsinformation.dk/eli/lta/2021/1843
- Sources: https://www.retsinformation.dk/eli/lta/2016/1497

== See also ==
- European driving licence
