= Driving licence in Kazakhstan =

Driving licence in Kazakhstan; Жүргізуші куәлігі
- Type: Driving licence
- Issued by: Ministry of Internal Affairs
- First issued: 1991
- In circulation: Yes
- Purpose: Authorisation
- Valid in: Kazakhstan
- Eligibility: 18 (cars); 16 (motorcycles); 21 (buses and commercial vehicles)
- Expiration: 10 years
- Rights: Legally drive specified vehicle categories; recognized digitally via eGov.kz portal
- Size: Credit-card format (ID-1 standard)
- Website: eGov.kz

Driving licence in Kazakhstan (Kazakh: Жүргізуші куәлігі; Russian: Водительское удостоверение) is an identity document authorizing the holder to drive motor vehicles on public roads in the Republic of Kazakhstan. Licences are issued by the Ministry of Internal Affairs through Specialized Citizen Service Centers (CSCs) and are generally valid for 10 years.

Kazakhstan is a contracting party to the 1968 Vienna Convention, and its licensing system and vehicle categories align with the Convention and its European Agreement supplement.

== History ==
In the time of the Kazakh Soviet Socialist Republic (Kazakh SSR), the driver licensing system was part of the all-Union framework of the Soviet Union. Standard licences were introduced in 1936 under the State Automobile Inspectorate (GAI) of the Ministry of Internal Affairs of the USSR, and Kazakhstan did not have its own authority. In 1963, after the Soviet Union joined the Geneva Convention on Road Traffic, drivers could also receive international permits, though they were uncommon. By the 1970s, the Kazakh SSR used the same categories as the rest of republics of the Soviet Union — A, B, C, D and E — for motorcycles, cars, trucks, buses and articulated vehicles.

After the collapse of the Soviet Union in 1991, Kazakhstan began to form its own legal framework for road traffic and driver licensing. On 17 April 1995, the country adopted the Law of the Republic of Kazakhstan No. 2200 "On Licensing", which established national procedures for issuing driving licences and replaced the Soviet-era regulations. Administration of licences was placed under the Ministry of Internal Affairs of the Republic of Kazakhstan, although in practice many procedures initially remained similar to those of the Soviet system.

This law was superseded on 11 January 2007 by a new Law "On Licensing" (No. 214-III), which modernized the licensing framework across multiple sectors, including driver licensing. It was later replaced on 16 May 2014 by the Law "On Permits and Notifications" (No. 202-V), which restructured the broader system of state regulation by distinguishing between activities requiring licences, permits, or simple notifications.

In 2013, Kazakhstan introduced reforms to bring the driver licence system closer to international standards. New subcategories, such as BE, CE, and DE, were adopted to reflect European classification practices. Licences began to be issued in both Kazakh and Russian languages, and the country moved toward modern features such as digital documentation and periodic revalidation of credentials.

== Legal framework ==
=== Issuing authority ===
Licensing is governed by Article 10 of the Law on the Republic of Kazakhstan No. 194-V "On Road Traffic" from 17 April 2014 and related regulations; the Ministry of Internal Affairs (MIA RK) is the issuing authority, with front-office services provided since June 2016 via specialized Citizen Service Centers (CSC) branches of the state corporation "Government for Citizens".

=== Validity and format ===
Standard licences are issued for 10 years. The document is a plastic card (ID-1, size 86×54 mm).

Current information included on a Kazakhstani driving licence (issued since 1 January 2020, updated under Order No. 1002 of 22 November 2019):

1. Surname
2. Name and patronymic (if any)
3. Date and place of birth
4. Details of the licence:
  - a) Date of issue
  - b) Expiration date
  - c) The name of issuing authority
  - d) Individual Identification Number (IIN)
5. Driving licence number
6. Photo
7. Personal signature
8. Permitted categories
9. Additional information, which may include:
  - Required eyeglasses or corrective lenses
  - Physical or medical restrictions (e.g., disability)
  - Administrative notes (traffic violations, suspensions, or penalties)
  - Other relevant entries allowed by law

The current form of the licence comes from Order No. 874 of the MIA RK from 8 December 2014, which replaced earlier versions introduced on 27 November 2000 under Order No. 644 and later amended on 27 September 2004 (No. 521) and 17 November 2005 (No. 639). The earlier licences contained similar information but gradually added administrative functions, integrated electronic chips, and standardized visual elements.

Licences issued before 2014 remain valid until their expiry or replacement. The 2014 revision also brought the design closer to modern digital documentation practices and introduced regional letter codes.

==== Digital driving licence ====
Since November 2020, a digital driving licence has been available in the eGov Mobile app under the "Digital Documents" service, alongside other national IDs. Beginning in March 2025, citizens may also request replacement of an expired or lost licence through the portal or mobile app and then collect the plastic card at a chosen Citizen Service Center (CSC).

== Categories ==
Kazakhstan follows the Vienna Convention system of licence categories.

The table below lists the vehicle categories, minimum ages, and conditions for obtaining each type as stipulated in Article 74 of the Law of the Republic of Kazakhstan "On Road Traffic".

Licence categories and minimum ages
Category	Vehicle type	Minimum age	Notes
A1	Light motorcycles (up to 125cc)	16	—
A	Motorcycles	18	—
B / B1	Cars and light vehicles	18	—
C1	Medium trucks	18	—
C	Heavy trucks	21	Requires prior experience
D1	Minibuses	21	Requires prior experience
D	Buses	23	Requires prior experience
Tb	Trolleybuses	23	With experience
BE / CE / DE / C1E / D1E	Combinations with trailers	Varies	Requires prior entitlement and experience

== Eligibility and medical requirements ==
Applicants must:

- meet the minimum age for the category,
- complete an approved driving school course,
- pass theory and practical examinations, and
- obtain a medical certificate (form 083/У); renewal before expiry generally does not require medicals.

== Examination ==
The theory test is computer-based (40 questions in 40 minutes) covering traffic rules, safety basics, and vehicle construction/operation. Successful candidates then take a practical test that assesses manoeuvres such as hill starts, parking, intersections, and reversing. A scoring table of errors applies; 100+ penalty points is a fail.

== Fees and processing ==
The state duty for issuing a licence is 1.25 MCI (4,915 ₸ as of 2025); typical production times are listed as 60 minutes for online re-issue notifications and 120 minutes at CSCs (excluding exam time).

== Recognition and international use ==
As a party to the Vienna Convention on Road Traffic, Kazakhstan recognizes the International Driving Permit (IDP) per the convention's model; designated bodies in Kazakhstan provide IDP services. For foreigners, recognition of a domestic licence and/or IDP depends on residence status and Convention rules.

== See also ==
- Kazakh identity card
- Kazakhstani passport
- Vehicle registration plates of Kazakhstan
- Transport in Kazakhstan
- Vienna Convention on Road Traffic
- International Driving Permit
