= Driving licence in Northern Cyprus =

North Cypriot driving licence
- Type: Driving licence
- Issued by: North Cyprus
- Purpose: Authorisation

Driving licence in Northern Cyprus (Turkish: Sürüş ehliyeti) is the official document issued in Turkish Republic of Northern Cyprus to authorise its holder to operate various types of motor vehicle on public roads.

== Obtaining a licence ==
The Turkish Republic of Northern Cyprus drivers licences can be obtained by TRNC citizens and citizens of other nations if they have a residency permit. Without either citizenship or a residency permit, TRNC licences cannot be obtained. TRNC car and motorcycle licences can be obtained at the age of 18, following a theory and practical exam on public roads. the price of driving licence is about 6000tl or 300 dollars.

Despite the TRNC being an internationally unrecognised state, TRNC licences are valid for use worldwide for the time frame set by the relevant country, as are all other licences. Since the opening of the border checkpoints in Cyprus, the Republic of Cyprus accepts TRNC issued licences as valid for use on their roads for 12 months.

Republic of Cyprus licences are also valid for use in the TRNC for 12 months, and are treated in the same manner as any other internationally issued licences would be.

The TRNC issues their licences in the form of a licence card, rather than on paper. Turkish and English are the languages used on the licence card.

== See also ==
- European driving licence
- Driving licence in Cyprus
