= Driving licence in Finland =

Ajokortti / Körkort
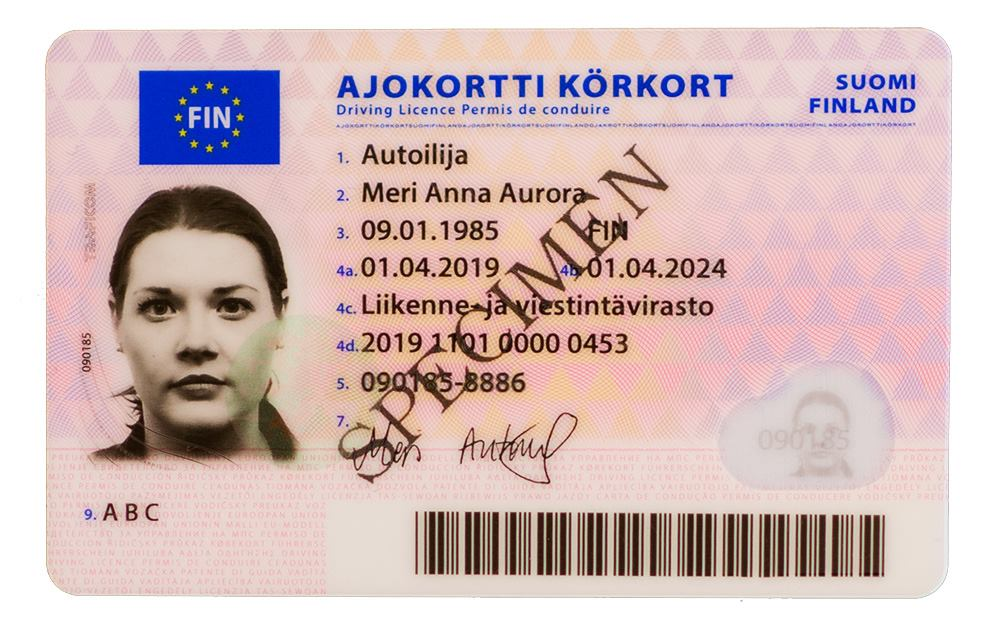
- View of the front

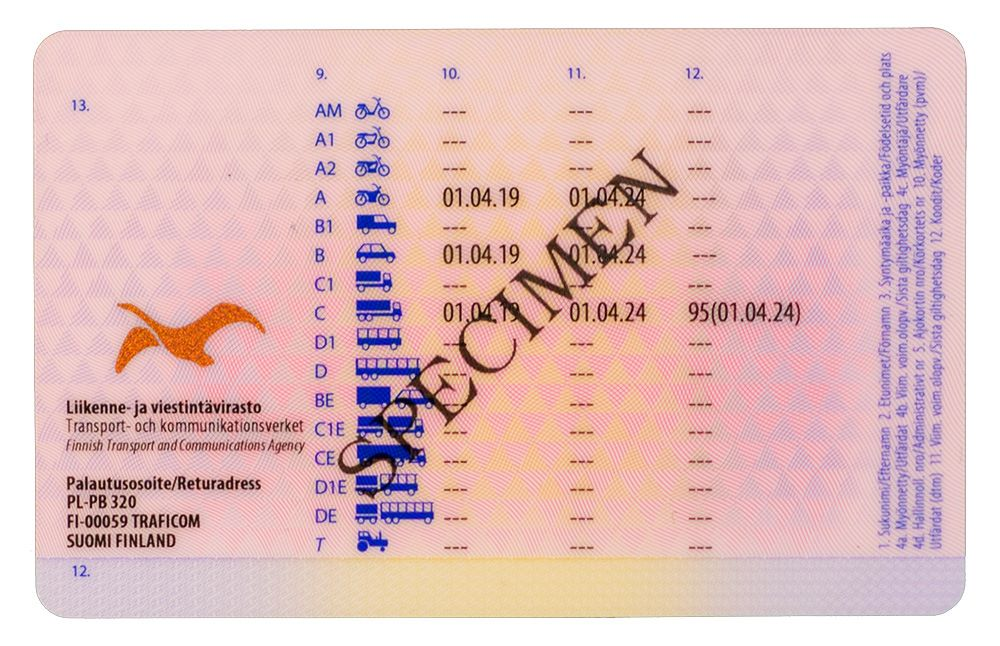
- View of the back
- Type: Driving licence
- First issued: 1922
- Purpose: Driving permit
- Expiration: 5–15 years

In Finland, a driver's licence (Finnish: ajokortti; Swedish: körkort) can be obtained by a person over 18 by passing a theory and a driving test. A person can be taught to drive at a driving school, or by a person, typically a relative, with a driving instruction permit.

== History ==
The first Finnish citizen to obtain a driving licence was author and businessman Yrjö Weilin (1875–1930), who obtained his driver's licence in 1907. The first driving schools in the country were established in the 1910s, and in 1922 the Eduskunta approved several regulations on automobile traffic which also standardised on Finnish driver licences for the first time.

== Requirements ==
A driving licence permit is required to get a driving licence as you cannot undergo theory and practical tests without it. Prerequisites include category-specific age and health requirements, being a permanent resident or a student with at least six months of residency, and no suspended licences in other EU or EEA countries. The permit is valid for three years.

Driving instruction can be obtained through a driving school, relative with a driving instruction permit, or with a combination of the two. It is possible to obtain driving instruction before applying for a driving licence permit as a student of a driving school or through an instructor who has been granted a driving instruction permit. Passenger car driving instruction includes at least 18 hours of instructions in total, including risk recognition training, theory, and driving lessons. In addition, for new licensees, an additional four-hour training for candidates for first driving licences (EAS) is required.

After driving instruction, the theory test is undertaken, which can be attended one month before turning 18. After successfully passing the theory test, the driving test can be taken once you have turned 18. It is also possible to be taken at the age of 17 if you have an age exception permit issued by Traficom or if you are studying a professional driver training course which includes obtaining the right to drive lorries or buses.

== After receipt ==
As per the new law introduced in 2018, the B-class passenger car training was changed to single-phase. This means the full licence is given right away as there is no longer a requirement for practice and advanced phase after receipt. These were replaced by undergoing a compulsory risk recognition training before the driving test.

After receiving the first right-to-drive, the driver is subject to stricter traffic enforcement for a period of two years. During this period, the licence can be suspended after two infringements instead of the normal three. If this is the case, it is required to undergo additional training before receiving the licence back. This dubbed "Driving ban training" includes four theory lessons assessing individuals' risk behaviour and its effects on traffic safety. The police will return the driving licence after receiving a proof of completing the course.

== Other vehicles ==
Motorcycles are divided into three categories. Anyone born before 1985 may drive a moped. Persons born in 1985 or after may obtain a moped driver's licence at the age of 15. This requires training in a driving school or by your relative. After that, there is a theory test and a short handling test. The A1 licence, allowing the use of light motorbikes, may be obtained at the age of 16. The practical training is done independently in traffic after a training permit has been obtained from the police. Theory training comprises 12 lessons. A person who has an A1 licence can get an A2 after holding the A1 for two years by completing an additional training course in a driving school. After two years of A2 licence, it can be turned into a full A licence with extra training in a driving school. After the age of 24, a person can obtain the A licence directly, without holding an A1 licence first.

Anyone with a valid B class licence can drive tractors and motorized sleighs. A T class licence for these vehicles only is also available from age 15, requiring a simple theory exam.

== See also ==
- European driving licence
