= Mobile driver's license =

Official mobile app substitute for a physical driver's license

A mobile driving licence (also mobile driver licence or mDL) is a mobile app that replaces a physical driving licence. An International Organization for Standardization (ISO) standard for the mobile driving licence (ISO/IEC 18013-5) was approved on 18 August 2021 and published on 30 September 2021.

== Countries and jurisdictions ==
=== Austria ===
The Austrian mobile driver's license was launched in October 2022. It is available through the governmental "eAusweise" app, which holds further official digital documents, such as the digital vehicle registration, digital identity verification, and digital age verification. The Austrian mobile driver's license acts as an official document equivalent to the physical driver's license. It can be presented as official proof at traffic stops without requiring an active internet connection. Since the launch of the digital vehicle registration in February 2024, the mobile driver’s license and the digital vehicle registration can be shown simultaneously within one QR code.

The Austrian mobile driver's license and all other documents of "eAusweise" are developed by „youniqx Identity AG“, a digital subsidiary of the Austrian State Printing Company (OSD), for the Austrian Federal Computing Centre (BRZ). The Austrian mobile driver's license is developed according to the internationally recognized ISO standard (ISO/IEC 18013-5) and is compatible with EU requirements for the upcoming EU Digital Identity Wallet (EUDI) in accordance with eIDAS 2.0.

=== Canada ===
In 2020, Ontario, in response to the COVID-19 pandemic, announced a "Digital Identity Program," including a mobile driver's license.

=== Denmark ===
In November 2020, Denmark publicly released a digital/mobile driving licence using a proprietary app implementation using a QR code, also not conforming to the ISO/IEC 18013-5 standard. Similar to Iceland's implementation, it is fully equivalent to physical IDs, however only valid in Denmark.

=== Iceland ===
Iceland was the second country in Europe to introduce a digital/mobile driver's licence in July 2020. Icelandic driving licence holders can request a digital version of their licence online by using their electronic ID (Icelandic: rafræn skilríki) and is issued as a .pkpass file loaded into the Wallet app on iPhone or a third-party app on Android. Digital driving licences display the same information as a physical licence, along with a barcode (renewed regularly by the server, acting as verification). Commercial establishments (e.g. for proof of age) can use the island.is app to verify barcodes. The licences are equally valid as official ID, even for voting, however only within Iceland. The implementation does not conform to the ISO/IEC 18013-5 standard. As of August 2022, 60% of driver's licences have been issued in digital/mobile form.

=== Kazakhstan ===
In November 2020, Kazakhstan introduced a digital version of the Kazakh driving licence through the government app eGov Mobile, under the "Digital Documents" service. The mobile licence displays the same information as the physical card and is legally valid for identification within Kazakhstan.

By 2025, the eGov Mobile app had more than 11 million registered users, with 5.8 million active monthly users, and about 45% of public services were accessed through digital documents, including mobile driving licences.

=== Mexico ===
The first instance of an electronic driver's license was deployed in Mexico as early as 2007, using the Gemalto smart-card platform. In 2016, the U.S. National Institute of Standards and Technology (NIST) partnered with Gemalto to pilot the "digital driver's license" in Washington D.C., Idaho, Colorado, Maryland and Wyoming.

=== New Zealand ===
The New Zealand Government and NZ Transport Agency Waka Kotahi have been working to make digital driver's licenses available. In 2025, Digitising Government minister Judith Collins announced that she hoped digital driver's licenses would be available by the end of the year, implemented in a "Govt.NZ" app. The first reading of the Regulatory Systems (Transport) Amendment Bill passed with support from all political parties, despite coalition partner Winston Peters introducing a Member's Bill to limit the use of digital IDs in New Zealand.

The government also released the NZ Verify app in 2025, which allows users to verify digital IDs issued in Australia and the United States using the ISO standard. The app was aimed at allowing tourism operators such as car rental companies to verify digital driver's licenses of overseas visitors. In May 2026 the government passed legislation to legalise digital driver's licenses.

=== Norway ===
On 1 October 2019, Norway became the first country in Europe to introduce a digital driver's license. A holder of a Norwegian driver's license can request a digital version of their physical driver's license after downloading the app Førerkort from their preferred app marketplace. The applicant must verify their identity with BankID upon logging in on the app for the first time, which will then retrieve information from the national database for driving licenses. After this procedure, the digital driver's license will display the exact same information as on the physical driver's license. The app only allows one phone with a digital driver's license per user.

If the holder has recently passed their driving exam or upgraded to a new category, and hence awaiting to receive their physical driving license, the app will display a temporary driving permit. When the physical driver's license has been produced, the app is able to display the holder's digital driver's license, regardless if the holder has received their physical driving license by mail yet or not. If a holder's driver's license has been revoked or suspended, this will information will be displayed in the app as long as the holder has not gotten their driver's license back.

Upon a traffic stop by the police or coming in contact with the Public Roads Administration, the digital driver's license is valid as a proof of identification. Although the driver's license comes with a barcode, which can be scanned by either government authorities, commercial establishments or even private persons to verify the details, it is not considered as a proof of identification in most places. The digital driver's license is not valid outside of Norway.

=== United States ===
==== Louisiana ====
The first mDL that claims compliance with ISO/IEC 18013-5 is Louisiana's, developed in part by Envoc, a software firm in Baton Rouge, whose president claimed that most drivers under 40 won't go back home if they forget their physical laminated license, "but if they forget their phone, they always turn around."

==== Colorado ====
Colorado was the first state to deploy a production version of a digital license, primarily based on QR codes stored in a digital wallet, which it claims is accepted by police officers throughout the state. After going through the standard process at the state Department of Motor Vehicles, volunteers installed the "DigiDL" app on their phones and then downloaded the license. Volunteers tested the digital driver's license in stores, the Colorado Lottery claim center, and an art fair.

=== European digital driving licence ===
On 21 October 2025, the European Parliament approved the creation of a European digital driving licence, according to the internationally recognized ISO standard (ISO/IEC 18013-5) and compatible with the EU Digital Identity Wallet (EUDI) in accordance with eIDAS 2.0. This follows the 'Proposal for a Revision of the Directive on Driving Licences' on 1 March 2023.

== Operating system support ==
Smartphone operating systems are adapting to the new standard. For example, Android's JetPack suite comes with specific support for ISO 18013–5 from version API 24. In March 2022, Apple introduced support for mobile IDs conforming to ISO 18013-5 in Apple Wallet, through a proprietary enrollment process which is implemented in partnership with governments. Arizona and Georgia became the first two states to announce that IDs were supported on Apple Wallet, starting with version iOS 15.4. On 23 March 2022, Arizona officially launched their program which includes the first TSA checkpoint to support Apple’s mobile driving licence, Phoenix Sky Harbour Airport.

== Conformance and testing ==
Safety organization Fime has a product to help test an app's conformance with the ISO/IEC 18013-5 standard. The Kantara Initiative created a "Privacy & Identity Protection in Mobile Driving License Ecosystems Discussion Group" to issue a report on the need for conformance specifications around identity and privacy.
