= Driving license in South Korea =

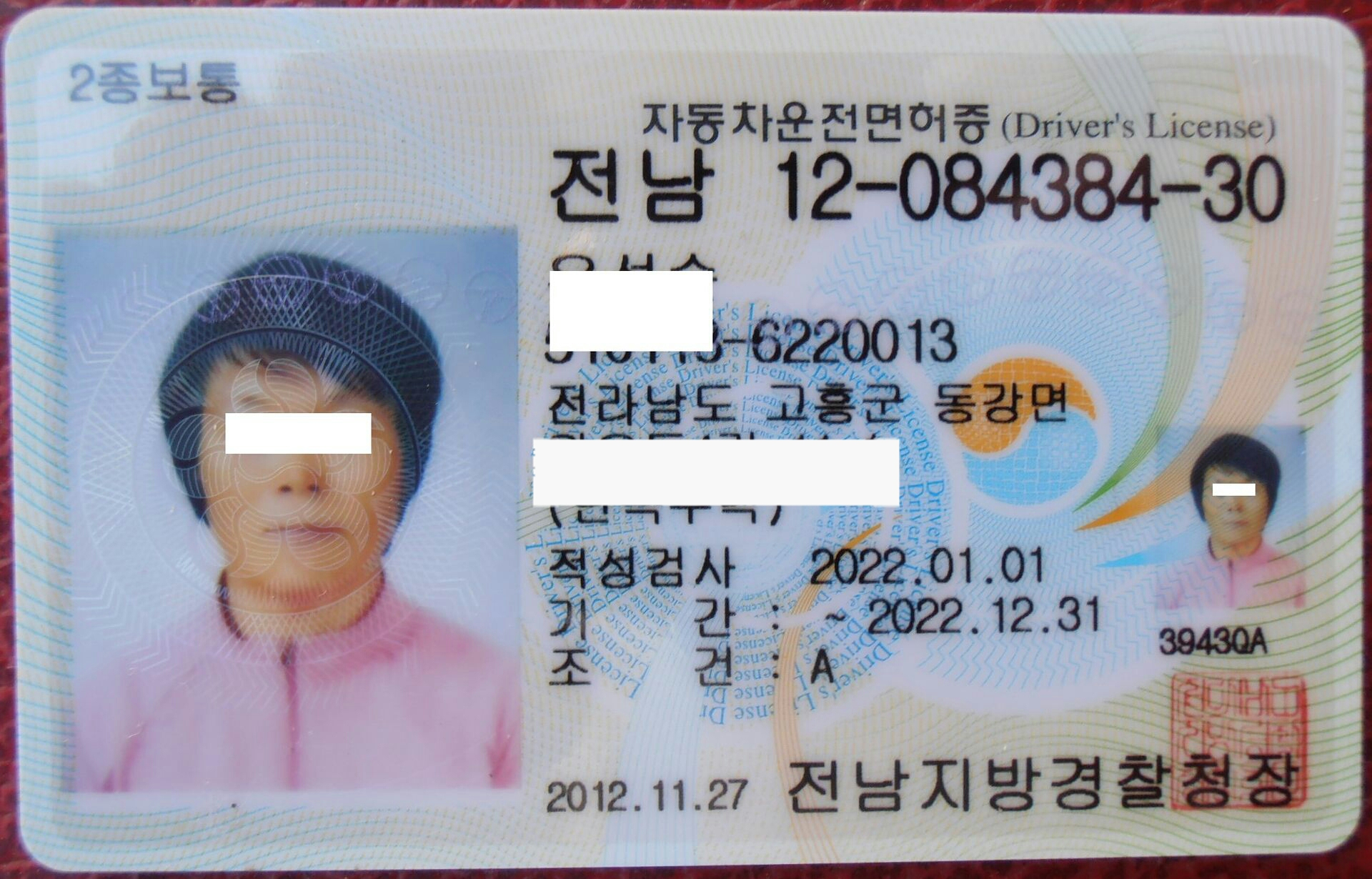
South Korean driver's license (anonymized), 2013.

Driving licenses in South Korea may be attained at age 18 for cars and motorcycles. South Korea is one of the few nations that issue International Driving Permits (IDP) to sixteen-year-olds. This was made possible by a South Korean law in 2009, which gave Military cadets the requirement of driving a motor-vehicle.

Currently, there is no requirements for elderly drivers in South Korea to give up their driving license as they age. However, various regional governments in South Korea give out benefits to senior citizens who give up their licenses voluntarily since at least 2023 due to an increase in traffic accidents involving senior drivers while the overall number of traffic accidents nationwide had been decreasing.

== Types of Licenses ==
Classes	Categories	Description	Minimum age
Class 1	Large vehicles	(Includes all vehicles of Class 1 General/Ordinary) 1) Passenger car or bus with seating capacity of over 15 2) Truck with a maximum loading capacity 12 tons or over 3) Construction machine (dump truck, asphalt distributor, road stabilizer, concrete mixer truck, concrete pump, truck with boring machine) 4) Special vehicle (except for trailer, tow truck), 5) Motorized bicycle (motorcycle with less than 125cc of engine displacement)	19
Class 1	General/Ordinary	(Includes all vehicles of Class 2 General/Ordinary) 1) Passenger car, bus with a seating capacity of 15 or under 2) Truck with a maximum loading capacity of under 12 tons 3) Construction machine (only forklift with maximum loading capacity of less 3 tons) 4) Special vehicle with a maximum gross weight under 10 tons (except for trailers, tow trucks) 5) Motorized bicycle (motorcycle with less than 125cc of engine displacement)	18
Class 1	Special (Large trailer)	(Includes all vehicles of Class 2 General/Ordinary) Trailer with maximum gross weight of over 3.5 tons	19
Class 1	Special (Small trailer)	(Includes all vehicles of Class 2 General/Ordinary) Trailer with maximum gross weight of 3.5 tons or under	19
Class 1	Special (Wrecker)	(Includes all vehicles of Class 2 General/Ordinary) Wrecker	19
Class 2	General/Ordinary	1) Passenger car or bus with seating capacity of 10 or under 2) Truck with a maximum loading capacity of 4 tons or under 3) Special vehicle with a maximum gross weight 3.5 tons or under (except for trailers, tow trucks) 5) Motorized bicycle (motorcycle with less than 125cc of engine displacement)	18
Class 2	Small vehicles (Motorcycle)	Any motor-equipped bicycle or motorcycle(no restriction for engine displacement)	18
Class 2	Motorized bicycle	Motorcycle with less than 125cc of engine displacement	16

Classified in a separate category that is not licensed, but the body can be operated in accordance with state and driving aptitude to limit the conditions under which the vehicle can be fitted. From July 1, 1995, based on a driver's license began, [3] from 24 July 2001 written in the Roman alphabet began. [4] In this case, the characters have a driver's license mechanism is as follows: (Road Traffic Enforcement Rules asterisk 20) [5]

The birth-date and year is printed in the first row of numbers, surrounded by 0 in the month/date/year format.

- A: Automatic transmission vehicles only (For Class 1, only for handicapped persons until June 2024)
- B: Prosthetic
- C: Prosthesis
- D: Hearing Aids
- E: Deaf cover and a convex mirror
- F: Manual brake, accelerator
- G: Specially designed and approved car
- H: Right direction indicator
- I: Left accelerator
- J: Multi-gear bike motor (or motor tricycle gear bike)

== Driver's License Card ==
All drivers must possess a physical Korean Driver's License card or an International Driving Permit. It is possible to acquire a Korean driver's license by also demonstrating legal residency and sitting for a (Korean / English) "rules of the road" examination. This may or may not also require an expatriate, or non-native Korean resident to prove knowledge. This can easily be done by presenting a legal and valid driver's license from their home country. For example, a residency permit card + a valid American driver's license (DL) should be enough to sit for a Korean DL exam.

Not having the appropriate card / permission can result in legal penalties. Non-native or Korean-by-heritage visitors must take special care. Infractions are not necessarily punishable or given based on a driver's inability to produce a physical driver's license. However, legal infractions are punishable and can be given when a driver fails to produce their driver's license and refuses to allow a police officer to identify themselves.

Class Type	자동차운전면허증(Driver's License)		
	Driver's License Document Number		
Photo			
Photo	Name (Last First Middle)		
Photo	Birthdate (YYMMDD) - Resident Registration Number		
Photo	Address		
Photo	Address		Photo
Photo	Renewal Period:	20XX . 01.01.	Photo
Photo	Renewal Period:	~ 20XX .12.31.	Photo
Photo	Restrictions: (if any)		Serial Number
	Date Issued	Name of the Police Commissioner	
