= Driving licence in Italy =

Driving licence
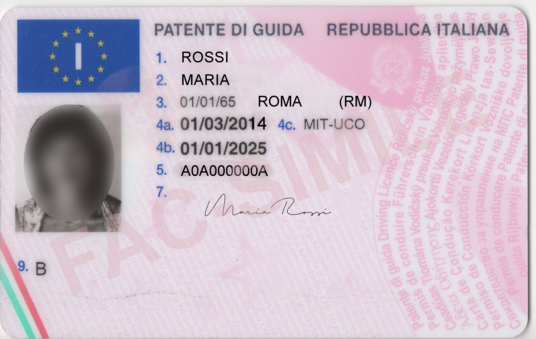
- Licence front

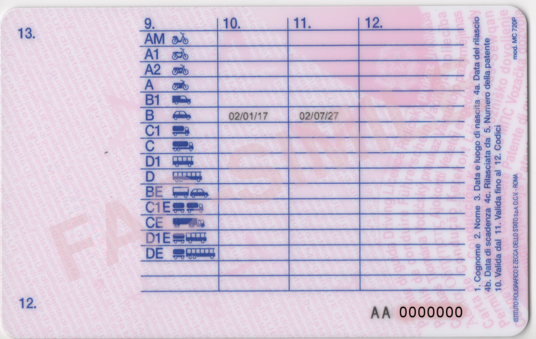
- Licence back
- Type: Driving licence
- Issued by: Italy
- Purpose: Identification

In Italy, the driving licence is a governmental right given to those who request a licence for any of the categories they choose. It is required for every type of motorized vehicle.

A driving licence in Italy is a European driving licence, adhering to Directive 2006/126/EC and valid throughout the European Economic Area.

The minimum age to obtain a driving licence is as follows:

- 16 years for a motorcycle of 125cc with a limit of motor power of 11 kW; a quadricycle motor (cars with a weight of 400 kg – 550 kg if it is for freight transport) and a motor power not exceeding 15 kW)
- 18 years for a car or motorcycle without a limit for the engine cylinder capacity and a limit of motor power of 35 kW
- 21 years for minibuses, three-wheelers without a limit of motor power, and cargo vehicles
- 24 years for motorcycles without limits of motor power; buses

The so-called "patentino" (small driving licence) was an Italian licence given to young people with a minimum age of 14 years. This licence permitted teenagers to drive scooters and "micro-cars" (small cars with a maximum motor power of 4 kW and a maximum speed of 45 km/h). In 2013, this was replaced with a new category of driver's licence.

Since February 2011, new drivers (less than one year) must not drive vehicles with an engine power greater than 70 kilowatts (95 horsepower), to reduce the number of teenager-caused collisions.

Since 2013, the driving test can be done with an automatic transmission vehicle, and a 78 code is applied on the back of the licence. If the driver wishes to remove it, they have to do another driving test, without doing the theory test.

== Obtaining a driver's licence ==
The Italian driving licence can be obtained after finishing a driver's education course and passing a two-stage test: a theory test and a driving test. An elementary school diploma is also required to obtain a valid driving licence.

In order to pass the theory test, an applicant cannot make more than three mistakes on a total of thirty questions related to road signs and street code articles. The test is timed and must be completed in twenty minutes. A failed theory test can be retaken once. After passing the theory test, the applicant receives a foglio rosa (learner's permit) that allows them to drive accompanied by an adult with ten or more years of driving experience. The permit is valid for twelve months, during which a driving test must be taken. A failed driving test can be retaken twice (three attempts overall).

The Italian driving licence is issued with a score of 20 points. These points are reduced in the event of violations of the Highway Code (with a greater deduction depending on the seriousness of the violation). Drivers can verify the number of points they have within a dedicated online portal.

== See also ==
- European driving licence
- Vehicle registration plates of Italy
- Italian identity card
- Italian passport
