= Driving licence in Germany =

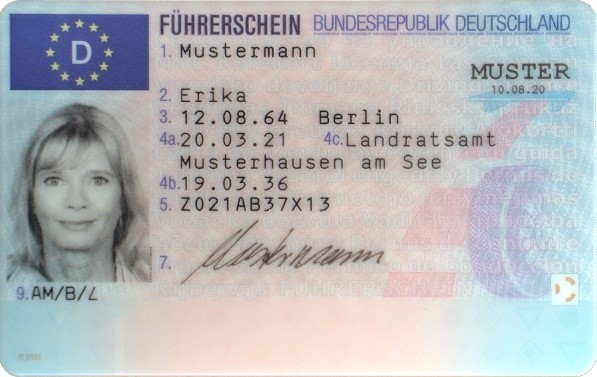
- German EU driving licence card (2021 layout)
- Type: Driving licence
- Issued by: Germany
- Purpose: Proof of permission to legally operate a motor vehicle
- Expiration: After 15 years

In Germany, the driving licence ("Führerschein") is a governmental privilege given to those who request a licence for any of the categories they desire. It is required for every type of motorised vehicle with the exception of the smallest mopeds below 50 cm³, with a speed limit of 25 km/h, as well as motorised bicycles (even for these, there is a minimum age of 15 years and a small mandatory driving school course). The types of licences one may obtain are the same in all the European Economic Area. See European driving licence.

The minimum age to obtain a driving licence is:

- 15 years for a small motorcycle up to 50 cm³ and limited to 45 km/h at the age of 15 (Class AM with key number 195). Certain vintage East German motorcycles (e. g. Simson) with top speeds of up to 60 km/h may be ridden with this type of licence, making them especially popular with young riders.
- 16 years for a restricted motorcycle up to 125 cm³ (Class A1),
- 17 years for a car with a legal guardian (Begleitetes Fahren "BF17"),
- 18 years for unrestricted car (Class B) and a restricted motorcycle up to 35 kW / 48 PS (Class A2)
- 21 years for buses (Class D1 and D) and cargo vehicles (Class C1 and C).

== Obtaining a driving licence ==
The German driving licence can be obtained after finishing driving school and passing both a theory and a practical examination.

In order to apply for a driving licence, it is necessary to show proof of an eye exam as well as a first aid course consisting of 9 units of each 45 minutes. Optometrists are bound by law to offer eye tests inexpensively. Similarly, first aid courses are offered by various aid organisations and typically cost between 20–50€.

The learner driver's training usually takes place in legally authorised and mostly privately owned, for-profit driving schools. The driving school handles all the necessary paperwork for the students, such as: applying for a licence, registering for tests etc.

The theoretical part of the education comprises lessons at the driving school, held by legally authorised driving instructors, typically in the evening. The content and number of the lessons is set by law and depending on the type of licence the student wishes to acquire, a different number of lessons has to be attended. Remarkably enough, a student does not have to attend different lessons, they could theoretically attend the same lesson several times to meet the criteria. Lessons are divided into general knowledge about road rules that anyone studying for any licence might attend and specialised lessons for certain types of vehicles. To prepare for the written theory test, students usually obtain a study package from the driving school which can consist of software programmes, textbooks and sample-exam papers. Schools usually take responsibility for their students' success and thus keep track of class attendance and hand out sample exams for practising. The theory test is a multiple-choice test consisting of randomised questions from a published guidebook. Thus the questions and correct answers can be studied in advance.

Practical training also takes place with driving-school instructors. Specially labelled and fitted vehicles are provided by the driving school. Cars are usually dual control (feature extra mirrors and pedals for the instructor so that they can take control of the vehicle in dangerous situations), since driving and parking manoeuvres are taught on public roads. For motorcycles, the student operates the motorcycle on their own with a driving instructor following in another vehicle and giving instruction via radio. A certain number of practical and technical lessons has to be completed again depending on the type of vehicle. Obligatory lessons include a minimum number of lessons each, driving on: the motorway Autobahn, rural areas, and in the dark. The actual number of lessons a student completes varies with individual skill. As the most difficult part of the driving test is usually urban driving, most lessons actually take place there, even though there is no mandated minimum for that.

If a student wishes to be tested in a car with an automatic transmission and sits the road test in such a car, a code or note will be added to the licence and the holder will only be permitted to drive cars with an automatic transmission. A test passed on a manual transmission car also gives qualification to drive either manual or automatic.

Theoretical and practical training may be commenced at the same or different times. Some driving schools may insist a student attend a certain number of lessons before giving out appointments for driving lessons.

Both exams are held by an authorised inspector who visits the driving school for this purpose. Students must pass the theory test before sitting the road test, with no more than a twelve-month gap between the two. During the road test, the driving instructor is present in the car with the assisting features of the driving-school car deactivated or connected to audio signals and a warning light (if the instructor has to intervene, the test will result in failure).

After each exam, results are immediately given to the students. In the case of the road test, if the student meets all the required criteria, a provisional licence (which is valid for three months or until the student receives their EU driver's licence, whichever comes sooner, and may only be used in Germany) is handed over by the inspector. The actual licence is sent to the student's home address at a later date. Should the student, for any reason, not be allowed to hold the licence at the time of a successful test (for example, because they have not yet reached the minimum age), the licence will be sent to the Kraftfahrzeug-Zulassungsbehörde (compare DMV DVLA) of the student's place of residence where it can be picked up as soon as the person becomes eligible. There are limits on the frequency and the time elapsed before failed tests can be reattempted.

A 2022 release from the TÜV (Technical Inspection Association) revealed that the failure rate for practical and theory exams is 37 and 39% respectively - a 10% increase since 2013. Automobile associations have given the opinion that this is due to the low quality of the education at driving schools as it benefits their income if students take additional lessons after failing.

For cars, people aged seventeen do not get a standard driving licence after passing all required tests. Instead, a permission slip that only allows for driving a car under the supervision of persons meeting certain criteria as stated on the permission slip. The actual driving licence becomes available upon the person's eighteenth birthday.

The cost of obtaining a licence for driving a car is on average €3,000 (USD$3,400 in May 2025) but varies widely according to an individual's skill, city and region. Individual driving schools set their own prices. The total includes fees for: authorities and exams, learning materials, driving lessons and tuition.

== National driving types ==
In Germany, the European driving licence classes as defined in EU law are applied. In addition, however, there are national driving licence classes that are only valid in Germany. The national driving licence classes are printed on the driver's licence in italics.

=== Driving licence class L ===
Prescribed speed sign 25 km/h according to StVZO § 58 for trailers on tractors of class L. With the driving licence class L

- agricultural and forestry tractors up to 40 km/h maximum design speed (with trailer max. 25 km/h)
- self-propelled machines with a maximum design speed of up to 25 km/h
- Forklifts and other industrial trucks up to 25 km/h maximum design speed.

can be driven. Class L can be acquired at the age of 16. Furthermore, class L is included in the driving licence classes B and T. The possession of the driving licence class L entitles only to drive corresponding vehicles for agricultural and forestry purposes. If one of the above-mentioned vehicles is to be driven for other reasons (e.g. to exhibitions), a driving licence corresponding to the total permissible mass of the vehicle (B, C1 or C, in the case of trailer operation BE, C1E or CE if applicable) must be held. The earmarking of class L applies only to driving licences issued on or after January 1, 1999. If a driver's licence issued before this date has been transferred, the purpose limitation of class L is usually cancelled by entering the code number 174.

=== Driving licence class T ===
With the driving licence class T may

- agricultural and forestry tractors up to 60 km/h
- self-propelled machines or self-propelled feed mixers up to 40 km/h.

may be driven. Class T can be acquired at the age of 16. Furthermore, class T is included in driving licence class CE or can be applied for additionally when exchanging a class 3 driving licence, if necessary. The restriction to agricultural and forestry purposes (see class L) also applies to class T. The acquisition of the driving licence class T includes the classes AM and L.

=== Driving licence class S ===
Between February 1, 2005 and January 18, 2013, people aged 16 and over were allowed to obtain the new driving licence class S in accordance with an EU regulation. It applied to light motorcycles and quads; light motorcycles are vehicles similar to passenger cars, but with a maximum weight of 350 kg (for electric vehicles, this value excludes the batteries).

For all vehicles that may be moved with the driving licence class S, it applies that the maximum speed determined by the design may not exceed 45 km/h and, in addition, the cubic capacity of petrol engines may not exceed 50 cm³ or, in the case of diesel or electric engines, the power may not exceed 4 kW.

The new driving licence class raised many questions and was highly controversial among politicians, traffic experts and parents alike in connection with the corresponding vehicles ("light vehicles"). Light vehicles in particular suffer from serious safety deficiencies.

Since January 19, 2013, Class S driving licences have no longer been issued. The authorisation to drive these vehicles is now in the new class AM (class L2E for the quad as a three-wheeled motorcycle, class L6e for the light motorcycle according to 2002/24 EC or today's Article 4 of Regulation (EU) No. 168/2013).

== Card validity ==
The driving licence card is valid for 15 years, and is replaced with a new card when it expires.

Before 19 January 2013, the driving licence card was valid without time limit. There is a decision that cards issued before that date expire on 19 January 2033.

In countries that do not have an obligatory identity document a driving licence is often accepted as proof of identity. There is an official German identity card, and the driving licence is not normally accepted as an identity document in Germany. An expired driving licence card does not result in the suspension of the driver's licence - it continues to exist regardless.

== Gallery of historic images ==
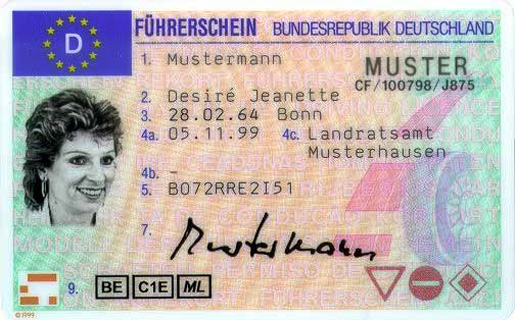
Old German driving licence with no expiry date (replaced 2013)

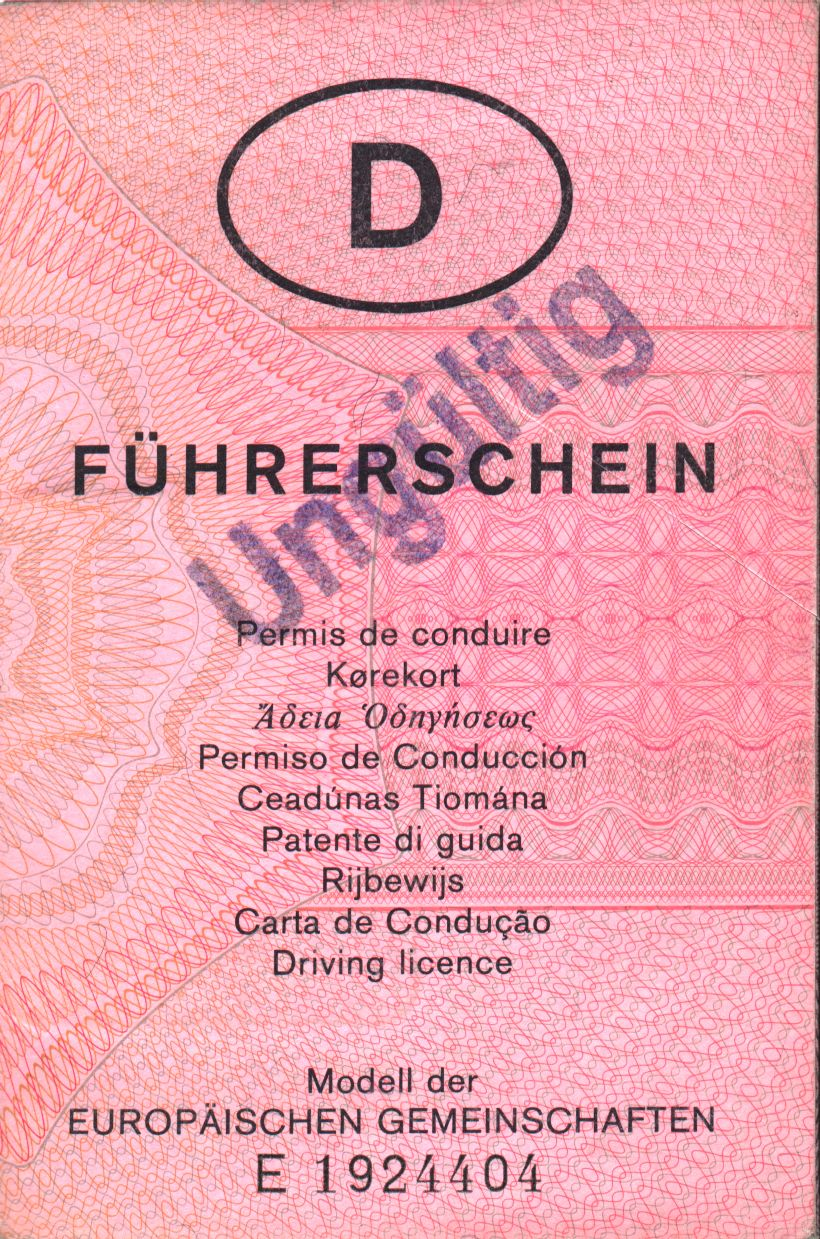
Old German paper driving licence (1986 - 1998), model of the European Communities

== See also ==
- European driving licence
- Vehicle registration plates of Germany
- German identity card
- German passport
