= Driving licence in Cyprus =

The Cyprus driving licence is the official document issued in Cyprus to authorise its holder to operate various types of motor vehicle on public roads.

Licences are issued by the Department of Transport which forms part of the Ministry of Communications and Works. Mopeds (less than 50cc) and cars can be driven on a learner's licence from the age of 17 and a half years old. Now you can obtain a full Cypriot driving licence from 18 years old. High capacity motorcycles and certain heavier vehicles can only be driven over the age of 21.

As of 2008, the cost is €59.80 (up to 60 years of age), €25.63 (60 to 65 years of age) and for those over 65 it is free. Drivers over 70 years of age require a fitness to drive certificate from a medical doctor.

A Cyprus licence is valid in all EU member states. They are printed on paper but new licences are now plastic credit card style, show the holder's photograph and have the standard EU vehicle categories and EU logo.

Offences such as speeding and drink driving are strictly policed and penalty points can be imposed on driving licences when caught. In certain serious cases or in repeat offences accumulating enough points a driving licence is revoked on a temporary or permanent basis.

Driving licences only apply for use of vehicles on public roads. Any vehicle can be driven on one's own land (or another person's, with the owner's permission) without a licence.

== See also ==
- European driving licence
- Driving licence in Northern Cyprus
