= Driving licence in the Netherlands =

- Type: Driving licence
- Issued by: Netherlands
- Purpose: Identification

In the Netherlands, a licence to drive a car (licence B) can be obtained from the age of 17. However, the drivers must be supervised by an adult, who's at least 27 years old, until reaching the age of 18.

If two serious offenses are committed within five years of a licence being issued to a new driver, the holder will have their licence revoked and must pass the test again to get their licence back. The offences include:

- Tailgating
- Exceeding the speed limit by at least 30 km/h (19 mph) (instant revocation when stopped by officers at 50 km/h over the limit)
- Drunk driving (blood alcohol content of 0.2 per mille or above)
- Causing death or injury by dangerous driving

== Requirement ==
A moped can be driven by persons aged 16 or over who are in possession of a moped licence (category AM). Since March 1, 2010 every driver is required to pass a practical exam in addition to a theory exam. Holders of category A or B licences are allowed to drive a moped without any additional documents or testing.

From 1 July 2015, a driving licence is required for a tractor designated with T. This licence can be obtained from 16 years of age. People with a driver's licence for cars (B) obtained on or before July 1, 2015 can drive a tractor without additional exams.

== Procedure ==
There are a few steps one needs to follow to obtain a licence. One has to go to a driving school (rijschool) and start to learn how to drive. There is also a compulsory theory exam at the CBR (Centraal Bureau Rijvaardigheidsbewijzen). In the Netherlands, bicycles are a very important part of the test. Cyclists are everywhere and cars need to yield to them quite frequently. Not yielding to a cyclist during your exam means you have failed automatically. One can also take the test in an automatic vehicle, which means one is only allowed to drive an automatic vehicle (code 78). There is no legal minimum number of lessons to be taken.

When the learner has passed their theory exam, they can request a TTT (TussenTijdse Toets). This is an intermediate exam in which the learner needs to do two special manoeuvres. If they complete these successfully, they are exempted from those manoeuvres in the final practical test. The manoeuvres include:

- Parking
- Turning
- Stopping (stopopdracht), i.e. stop behind a vehicle and drive away

A learner who has passed the theory exam can take the practical exam, provided the CBR has decided that the learner is eligible. One has to fill out an EV (Eigen Verklaring): a list of eleven questions about one's general health (e.g. "have you ever been treated for a mental illness or do you have diabetes?") The practical exam covers everything that should have been learned: looking in the inside mirror, then the wing mirror and then over one's shoulder at every turn (twice per turn), driving onto and on the motorway, knowing what is under the bonnet, what all the lights on the dashboard mean, etc.

After passing the exam, one has to go to the town/city hall with an approved passport photograph; a few days later, the licence can be collected. When the practical exam is completed by a 17-year-old, they also need a pass to get their licence. The pass includes the name of the driver and the name(s) of the supervisors: only the supervisors named on the pass can supervise.
