= PKPASS =

File format for digital passes

- Filename extensions: .pkpass, .pkpasses
- Internet media type: application/vnd.apple.pkpass; application/vnd.apple.pkpasses
- Developed by: Apple
- Extended from: ZIP

PKPASS is a file format for storage and exchange of digital passes developed by Apple for its Wallet application. Passes can replace physical paper or plastic cards, like a payment card, boarding pass, loyalty card or coupon. The format specification has been published online and this allowed for compatible implementations to be developed for other platforms like Android, Windows and Linux.

== Characteristics ==
The file is a ZIP archive with a filename extension .pkpass containing a set of digitally signed files describing the digital pass. Multiple .pkpass files can be further combined into a single ZIP archive with an extension of .pkpasses in order to combine several digital passes for ease of distribution.

The file contents of a sample PKPASS file might look like this:

- icon.png
- icon@2x.png
- pass.json
- manifest.json
- signature
- en.lproj/
  - logo.png
  - logo@2x.png
  - pass.strings
- ru.lproj/
  - logo.png
  - logo@2x.png
  - pass.strings

icon.png is the digital pass icon. logo.png is displayed at the top left of the rendered pass.

Localized resources - like images and strings - are stored in subfolders named like this: <language_identifier>-<region_identifier>.lproj

The file pass.json is a JSON formatted dictionary describing the digital pass.

manifest.json contains a JSON dictionary containing SHA-1 hashes for all files except the manifest itself and the signature.

signature contains a PKCS #7 signature of the manifest file thus effectively signing all files in the bundle.
