= Icelandic nationality law =

Icelandic Nationality Act Lög um íslenskan ríkisborgararétt

Althing
- Citation: 1952 nr. 100
- Territorial extent: Iceland
- Enacted by: Lower House
- Enacted: 23 December 1952
- Enacted by: Upper House
- Enacted: 12 December 1952
- Commenced: 1 January 1953
- Administered by: Ministry of Justice

Legislative history

Initiating chamber: Lower House
- First reading: 2 October 1952
- Second reading: 26 November 1952

Revising chamber: Upper House
- Second reading: 9 December 1952
- Status: Amended

The primary law governing nationality of Iceland is the Icelandic Nationality Act (Icelandic: Lög um íslenskan ríkisborgararétt), which came into force on 1 January 1953. Iceland is a member state of the European Economic Area (EEA) and European Free Trade Association (EFTA). All Icelandic nationals are entitled to free movement rights in European Union (EU) and EFTA countries.

Any person born within Iceland to at least one Icelandic parent receives citizenship at birth. Children born overseas are also Icelandic citizens if they are born to a married Icelandic parent, or to an unmarried Icelandic mother. Individuals born to an unmarried Icelandic father are eligible to acquire citizenship by registration before age 18. Foreign nationals may naturalise after meeting a minimum residence requirement (seven years), demonstrating proficiency in the Icelandic language and proving financial self-sufficiency.

All Icelandic citizens have an Icelandic ID number and are entitled to an Icelandic passport and Icelandic identity card, provided that they do not have a legal travel ban imposed on them.

== Terminology ==
The distinction between the meaning of the terms citizenship and nationality is not always clear in the English language and differs by country. Generally, nationality refers a person's legal belonging to a state and is the common term used in international treaties when referring to members of that polity; citizenship refers to the set of rights and duties a person has in that nation.

In Icelandic legislation, the term "citizenship" (ríkisborgararétt) is used to refer to state membership. "Nationality" (þjóðerni) is used in other laws but usually refers to a person's ethnic group. While the difference between these two terms is not precise in general discourse within Iceland, "citizenship" would be the technical term used in domestic legislation to refer to members of the national constituency. Despite this, the Icelandic government translates the name of the principal act governing citizenship requirements (Lög um íslenskan ríkisborgararétt) as the "Icelandic Nationality Act".

== History ==
=== Early history and Danish realm ===
Iceland was first settled by Norsemen and Celts in the eighth and ninth centuries. No unified governing body existed until the 10th century when local chieftains formed the Althing, which established a set of local laws closely following those of Norway. The Icelandic clans swore fealty to the Norwegian king in 1262–1264, and the island later fell under Danish rule when the entire Kingdom of Norway became part of the Kalmar Union in 1397. Iceland remained part of the Kingdom of Denmark despite Norway's separation in 1814.

Denmark adopted its first constitution in 1849. Although rules on nationality were not explicitly codified, eligibility for voting rights and appointment in the civil service were regulated in this document. Iceland was defined in an 1871 statute as an integral part of Denmark with special territorial rights. The island was granted its own constitution in 1874, which restricted eligibility for the civil service to those with knowledge of the Icelandic language. The Folketing enacted its first nationality legislation in 1898 that applied to the entire Danish Realm. This law established descent from Danes as the primary means of acquiring Danish nationality.

=== Independent kingdom ===
Iceland became a fully independent kingdom in 1918, although it remained in personal union with Denmark. The Danish–Icelandic Act of Union did not establish separate nationalities at the time of independence and lacked any specific provisions for determining which citizens would belong to which kingdom. When Iceland did enact its own nationality legislation in 1919, the new law essentially mirrored the regulations set out in the 1898 Danish law. This separation in nationalities became fully established following ratification of the Constitution of Iceland, after which political participation became restricted only to Icelandic citizens. Despite Iceland's independence, the two countries agreed to remain closely aligned in nationality regulations, as specified in the Union Act.

Under the 1919 Act, children born to married Icelandic fathers and unmarried Icelandic mothers automatically received citizenship at birth. Any person born in Iceland who did not receive citizenship at birth could acquire it if they remained domiciled in the country until age 19, unless they made an official declaration of their intent not to acquire citizenship. Women acquired the nationality of their husbands on marriage, as well as any children born to couples preceding their marriages. Consequently, Icelandic women who married foreigners and any children they had before marriage automatically lost Icelandic citizenship. However, marriage did not affect a child's nationality if their mother was marrying someone other than their father. Following changes in Norway and Sweden that repealed marital denaturalisation in 1924, Denmark and Iceland followed suit in 1925 and 1926.

During the immediate period following independence, foreigners could only be naturalised through individual acts of the Althing. There were no codified regulations and applicants could be approved or denied citizenship at the legislature's discretion. While most applications were accepted, only 62 people became Icelandic citizens from 1921 to 1935. Harsh economic conditions during the Great Depression and political turmoil in mainland Europe led to anti-immigration sentiment among parliamentarians, who introduced a ten-year residence requirement for naturalisation in 1935. Indebted foreigners who had received church welfare were barred from acquiring citizenship, as well as those who had engaged in "disgraceful" conduct in Iceland or overseas. Despite these restrictions, 51 applicants were approved between 1936 and 1940. The 1935 legislation was technically unconstitutional; the Althing is empowered by the Constitution to grant citizenship and it cannot limit its own ability to do so through ordinary legislation. Nevertheless, these regulations remained codified in statute law until 1952.

=== Subsequent reforms as a republic ===
During the Second World War, Denmark was occupied by Nazi Germany. Iceland was subsequently occupied by the Allies due to its strategic position in the Atlantic. The Althing initially empowered a regent to rule in the king's place, but later abolished the monarchy and Iceland became a republic in 1944. Danish citizens domiciled in the country before March 1945 continued to be treated identically to Icelandic citizens. At least 30 Danes continued to exercise free movement in Iceland under this provision at the end of the 20th century. Although Icelandic legislators nominally remained skeptical of further immigration into the country during the post-war period, approval for naturalisation remained subject to their absolute discretion. Applicants who were deemed to be useful to Iceland were more likely to succeed, while those suspected of holding sympathetic views towards communism were guaranteed to be rejected.

Denmark, Norway, and Sweden passed a set of coordinated reforms to their nationality laws in 1950. Iceland followed suit and enacted the Icelandic Nationality Act in 1952, which introduced a streamlined administrative process with a standard set of requirements. Under this Act, citizens of other Nordic countries could naturalise after living in Iceland for at least five years. All other noncitizens could acquire citizenship after being domiciled for 10 years. Individuals married to Icelanders qualified for naturalisation after three years of residence, but only if the Icelandic spouse had been a citizen for more than five years. Children born to one Icelandic and one foreign parent were eligible for citizenship after being domiciled for five years, or three years if the foreign parent was Nordic. Former citizens could reacquire Icelandic nationality after living in the country for one year. Women who originally held Icelandic citizenship but lost that status through marriage to foreign men could reclaim their nationality on dissolution of their marriages and redomiciling in the country for one year; any children under age 16 of such women were eligible to acquire citizenship through the same method.

The 1952 Act added a strict requirement for all successful naturalisation applicants to adopt an Icelandic name. Icelandic surnames are derived from the first name of a person's father, and this is not possible using foreign names. Individuals who naturalised before this legislation were allowed to retain their foreign names. However, when Vladimir Ashkenazy applied for citizenship in 1972, he was granted an exemption from this requirement by the Minister of Justice. Long-term residents who had previously declined to apply for naturalisation used this precedent to also petition waivers from this requirement. This regulation was relaxed in the 1970s; new citizens were only asked to adopt an Icelandic first name. The Althing fully abolished this requirement in 1996.

Further reforms in 1982 addressed gender imbalances in transferring citizenship by descent. Since that year, children born to Icelandic women, regardless of their marital status, are Icelandic citizens at birth. However, this amendment did not alter similar provisions for unmarried Icelandic men. This was addressed by additional changes in 1998; children born in Iceland to an Icelandic father and foreign national mother automatically acquire Icelandic citizenship at birth. Individuals born to such couples overseas are entitled to apply for citizenship if their paternity has been formally established. If their parents marry before they reach age 18, they automatically acquire citizenship.

Restrictions on holding multiple nationalities were lifted in 2003; Icelandic citizens no longer lose their citizenship when acquiring foreign nationalities. Individuals who have been living in the country since childhood gained facilitated pathways to citizenship in that year as well; foreign nationals between the ages of 18 and 20 continuously domiciled in Iceland since age 11 are entitled to acquire citizenship. Stateless individuals in that age range are eligible if their residence began at age 13.

==== European integration ====
Iceland joined the Nordic Passport Union in 1966, an open border arrangement with Denmark, Finland, Norway, and Sweden allowing citizens of each country to live and work in any member state. The country became part of the European Free Trade Association (EFTA) soon after, in 1970.

The formation of the European Union (EU) and consequent creation of EU citizenship allowed nationals of all EU countries free movement rights in the entire Union. The scope of these rights was expanded with the establishment of the European Economic Area (EEA) in 1994 to include nationals of all EEA member states, which included the entire EFTA except for Liechtenstein and Switzerland. All Nordic states, including Iceland, became party to the EEA. Liechtenstein later acceded to the EEA in 1995, while Switzerland concluded a separate free movement agreement with the EU that came into force in 2002. Liechtenstein exceptionally maintains immigration controls on EEA/Swiss citizens despite its EEA membership due to its small geographic and population size.

== Acquisition and loss of citizenship ==
=== Entitlement by birth, descent, or adoption ===
Any person born within Iceland to at least one parent who is an Icelandic citizen automatically receives citizenship at birth. Children born overseas are also Icelandic citizens if they are born to a married Icelandic parent, or to an unmarried Icelandic mother. Individuals born overseas to an Icelandic father and foreign national mother who are unmarried are eligible to acquire citizenship by registration before the age of 18; children born to such couples automatically become Icelandic citizens if the parents later marry. Foreign children under the age of 12 adopted in the country by Icelandic citizens are automatically granted citizenship at the time of adoption, while those adopted abroad may become citizens on request by the adopting parents to the Icelandic government. Abandoned children found in the country are considered to be Icelandic unless evidence can be found establishing their possession of an alternate nationality.

=== Facilitated acquisition for resident children ===
Foreign children with a long period of residence in the country may be eligible for a facilitated process of naturalisation. Any foreign national who continuously resides in Iceland from age 11 to 18, or a stateless individual domiciled from age 13 to 18, are entitled to acquire Icelandic citizenship by declaration before age 20. Stateless children born in Iceland who have not acquired Icelandic citizenship, the right to acquire Icelandic citizenship, or any other nationality by age 3 may be granted citizenship at the discretion of the Minister of Justice.

=== Voluntary acquisition ===
Foreigners may become Icelandic citizens by naturalisation after residing in the country for more than seven years. The residency requirement is reduced to three years if an applicant is married to an Icelandic citizen, four years for citizens of other Nordic countries, or five years for recognised refugees. Applicants must be financially self-sufficient and demonstrate proficiency in the Icelandic language (at least at the A2 level in the Common European Framework of Reference for Languages). Additionally, they may not have any outstanding tax obligations, have declared bankruptcy, or received state assistance during the preceding three years. Any person who has been fined or incarcerated for a criminal offense, or is a defendant in a pending criminal case, for any conduct that would be deemed a crime in Iceland may be disqualified from naturalisation.

Individuals wishing to become citizens but do not meet all of the naturalisation criteria may nevertheless petition the Althing for a direct grant of citizenship through statutory law. This method of awarding citizenship is not bound by any specific criteria and is routinely considered by the legislature twice per year. Non-naturalised citizens of other Nordic countries are also entitled to acquire Icelandic citizenship by declaration after four years of residence in Iceland.

=== Loss and resumption ===
Icelandic citizens may apply to be released from their citizenship by the Minister of Justice, provided that the applicant ordinarily resides overseas and already possesses or is in the process of obtaining another nationality. An Icelandic citizen resident within Iceland cannot be released from their citizenship, unless the Minister determines that there is sufficient reason to do so.

Citizenship may be involuntarily removed from any citizen who was born abroad and has never been permanently resident in Iceland, or resided in the country for any reason that could be interpreted as wishing to remain an Icelandic citizen, before age 22. Such individuals may nevertheless apply to retain their citizenship provided that they do so also before the age of 22. Former citizens who naturalise in another Nordic country and later reacquire domicile in Iceland may reacquire Icelandic citizenship by formally notifying the government of their intention to do so. Individuals who acquire citizenship by birth and reside in the country until age 18 but later lose Icelandic citizenship may regain it by declaration, provided that they are domiciled in Iceland for two years prior to their declaration.

== See also ==
- Visa policy of Iceland
- Visa requirements for Icelandic citizens
