= National identification numbering in Iceland =

National identification numbering in Iceland was established in 1953 when the birth number system was implemented. In 1959, the name number system was implemented and used parallel to the birth number. The third and present system is the identification number which replaced both previous systems, introduced in 1987.

== Birth number (1953–1988) ==
The birth number (Icelandic: fæðingarnúmer) was the first national identification number in Iceland. It was composed of 6 numbers but was later extended to 8 numbers.

== Name number (1959–1988) ==
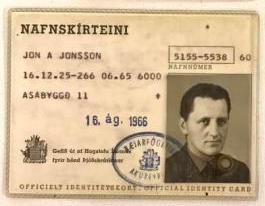
Icelandic ID card from 1966. The name number can be seen in the top right.

The name number (Icelandic: nafnnúmer) was the second national identification number in Iceland. It was based on the individual's name and thus allowed alphabetical ordering since computers at the time could not work with the alphabet directly.

Shortly after, in 1965, an Icelandic identity card (Icelandic: Nafnskírteini) was introduced. It contained the name number and birth number, and raised awareness and usage of the new name number. The name number was discontinued in 1987.

== Identification number (1987–present) ==
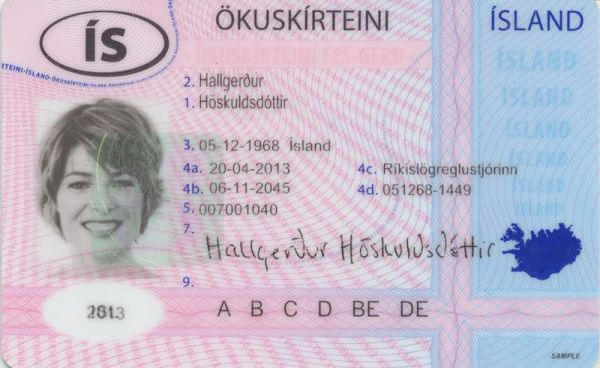
Icelandic driving licence with the ID number displayed on the right side on field 4d.

The identification number (Icelandic: kennitala) is the third and current national identification number in Iceland. The Icelandic identification number is used extensively in Iceland and is printed on all official identity documents, the Icelandic passport, Icelandic identity card and Icelandic driving license. It is also a prerequisite to obtaining an Icelandic electronic ID.

A System Identification Number (Icelandic: Kerfiskennitala) can be issued to individuals from the EEA/EFTA who do not intend to establish permanent residence in Iceland, but need an ID no. for tax or other purposes.

== See also ==
- Registers Iceland
- Icelandic identification number
- Icelandic identity card
