= Icelandic identity card =

National identity card of Iceland

Icelandic identity card Nafnskírteini
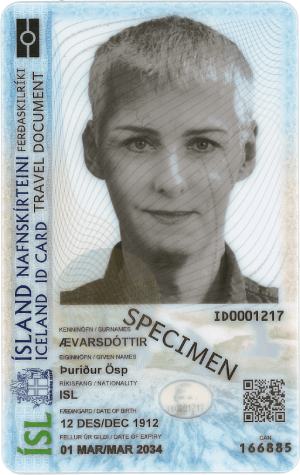
- Front of card (2024)

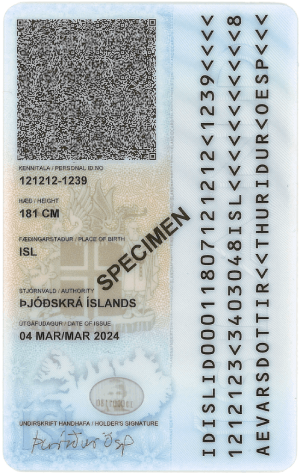
- Back of card
- Type: Identity card, optional replacement for passport for travel to EU and EFTA countries.
- Issued by: Iceland; Registers Iceland
- First issued: 14 April 1965 (first version); 5 March 2024 (current version)
- Purpose: Identification & travel document
- Valid in: EFTA; European Union; United Kingdom (Pre-Settled or Settled Status); Rest of Europe (except Belarus, Russia, and Ukraine) Greenland; Overseas France
- Eligibility: Icelandic Citizens
- Expiration: 10 years (over age 18); 5 years (under age 18)
- Cost: ISK 9,200 (ages 18-66); ISK 4,600 (children, elderly and disabled)
- Size: ID-1

The Icelandic identity card (Icelandic: Nafnskírteini), is a voluntary identity document issued by Registers Iceland on behalf of the Icelandic Government. It is only issued to Icelandic citizens and may indicate citizenship, so that it can be used as a travel document facilitating freedom of movement within the European Union and the European Free Trade Association.

The Icelandic identity card is uncommon in Iceland, as most people use their driving licence as ID. In 2024, an updated EU compliant design was introduced, allowing the card to be used for travel in the EU/EFTA.

An electronic ID (Icelandic: Rafræn Skilríki) is issued separately from the regular ID card.

== Characteristics ==
Since 2024, credit card-sized (ID-1) cards have been issued which are machine-readable and biometrically compliant with EU 2019/1157 regulations. They are the first in the world to adhere to the new ICAO 9303 standard in a vertical format. The card is written in Icelandic and English. They are valid for 10 years for adults and for 5 years for children under the age of 18.

Countries and regions in which the Icelandic identity card is valid.

=== International acceptance ===
As an alternative to presenting a passport, Icelandic citizens are entitled to use their ID card to exercise their right of free movement in EFTA, EU and Nordic countries instead of a passport. Icelandic identity cards are also accepted for entry to countries such as Bosnia and Herzegovina, Serbia, Albania, Kosovo, Montenegro, North Macedonia, Moldova and French Overseas Territories.

For travel within the Nordic countries no identity documentation is legally required for Icelandic citizens due to the Nordic Passport Union.

== Issue ==
ID cards are issued by local sheriffs or consulates on behalf of Registers Iceland to Icelandic citizens regardless of age in the same way as Icelandic passports.

The cost of an ID card is 9,200 ISK (ages 18–66). A reduced price of 4,600 ISK is charged for children, elderly and disabled citizens. For an expedited issuance (within 2 days) the price is doubled.

=== Children ===
The consent of a parent/guardian must be submitted on applications for persons under the age of 13. For cards issued with travel rights for a child aged under 18, both parents/guardians must give their consent, as international travel of children is strictly controlled in Iceland.

==== ID card without travel rights ====
A distinct version of the ID card is available without travel rights which does not state Icelandic citizenship. This card is for children aged 13–18 applying for a card without travel consent from their parents/guardians, or for individuals who are not legally permitted to travel internationally (e.g. due to judicial order) Cards without travel rights have no MRZ and the document number begins with II (instead of standard ID).

== Electronic identification (eID) ==
Electronic IDs (Icelandic: Rafræn skilríki) were introduced in Iceland in 2008, are extensively used by the public and private sectors linked to the Icelandic ID number. The system is used by all banks, e-government services, healthcare, education, document signing and over 300 private companies for customer page logins.

In Iceland 97% of the eligible population has an active eID, including 75% of over 75s. eIDs are only for online/electronic identification and cannot be used in person.

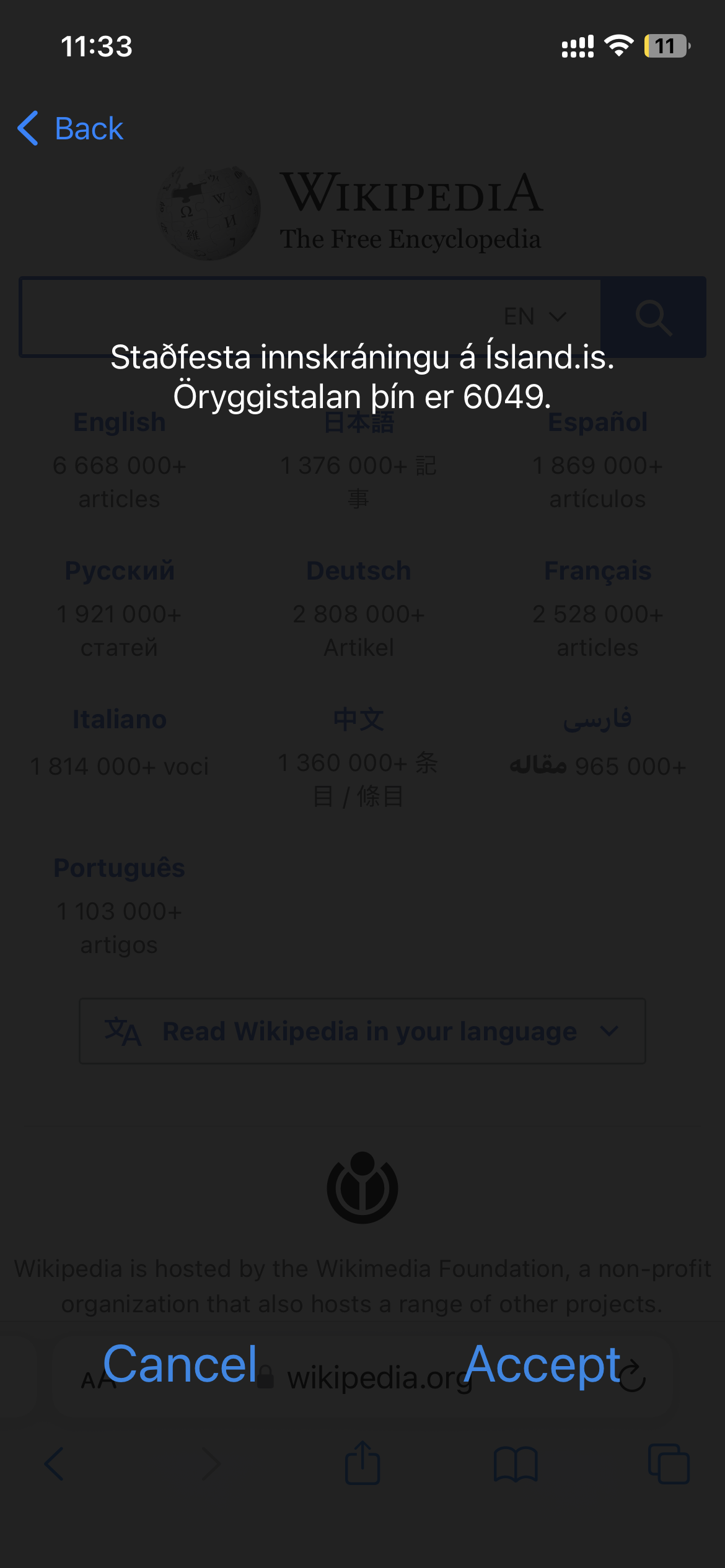
Login using a SIM eID by flash SMS.

At enrolment centres users present physical ID and create a PIN. Those with an Icelandic ID number aged 13 or over are eligible.

As of 2023, there are three versions of eIDs:

1. Physical digital ID EMV smartcards (Icelandic: Auðkenniskort) which are valid for 1 year and do not contain a photo, and are only usable electronically using a smartcard reader through a PC.
2. SIM card digital IDs: When used, a prompt via flash SMS is initiated and the PIN code is validated. An Icelandic SIM card is required. This is the most widespread implementation of eIDs.
3. App digital eID: a mobile application available on the Apple App Store or the Google Play Store. Biometric enrolment using an Icelandic passport is possible using the app.

== History ==
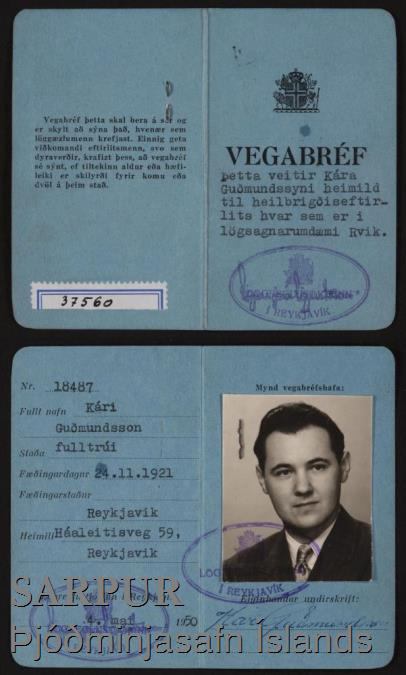
Icelandic 'passport' used as an identification document during wartime from 1942 to 1945.

=== Earlier ID cards ===
In medieval times, while under the control of other Scandinavian powers, internal passports were required for certain individuals. The first legal instance of internal passports, then called Reisupassi or passi, were issued from 1781 for certain individuals travelling between regions of Iceland (mostly freemen). In the 19th century, the role of internal passports was questioned, progressively unenforced, and were officially repealed in 1907.

From 1942 to 1945, during the British occupation of Iceland of the Second World War, emergency laws were introduced requiring domestic identification. Domestic 'passports', simple blue folded paper cards with a photograph, effectively acting as identity cards, were issued to all residents who were required to carry them at all times. The domestic passports were abolished after the occupation in 1945.

=== 1965-2024 identity cards ===
The Icelandic national register was created in 1951, followed by an ID number in 1959. Subsequently, identity cards were launched in 1965 and citizens and residents in Iceland aged over 12 were eligible for the ID card. They were usually distributed to all children through schools at the age of 12, valid indefinitely.

The ID cards were laminated white paper cards in ID-2 size, with a photograph stamped by the issuing authority. Cards were free of charge for the first issue, with a photograph being provided by the applicant. The cards were only written in Icelandic and did not have an expiry date or document number. The reverse side contained an explanation of the contents of the card. In earlier versions a residential address and 4-digit postal number were included.

From 1974 cards were issued at age 14, to make photographs more recognisable at later ages. In 1986, Icelandic ID numbers replaced older 'name numbers' and citizenship started to be included. In the late 1990s, cards stopped being issued by default and had to be collected.

The old-style Icelandic ID cards did not fulfil international document security requirements and were therefore not valid for travel. However, they did contain the holder's citizenship, but this was not clearly indicated on the card and was only written in Icelandic. The old-style cards were not certified by the Icelandic government as a travel document outside of the Nordic Countries.

==== Characteristics ====
Until their last issue in 2023, the information contained on the cards included:

- Full name
- Icelandic identification number (Icelandic: Kennitala), containing date of birth
- Place of birth
- Citizenship (RF.XX, where XX is the two letter country code e.g. RF.IS for Icelandic citizens)
- Date of issue
- Photograph (dated stamp by the issuing authority, usually Registers Iceland)
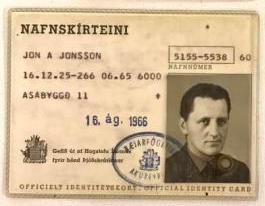
Card issued in 1966

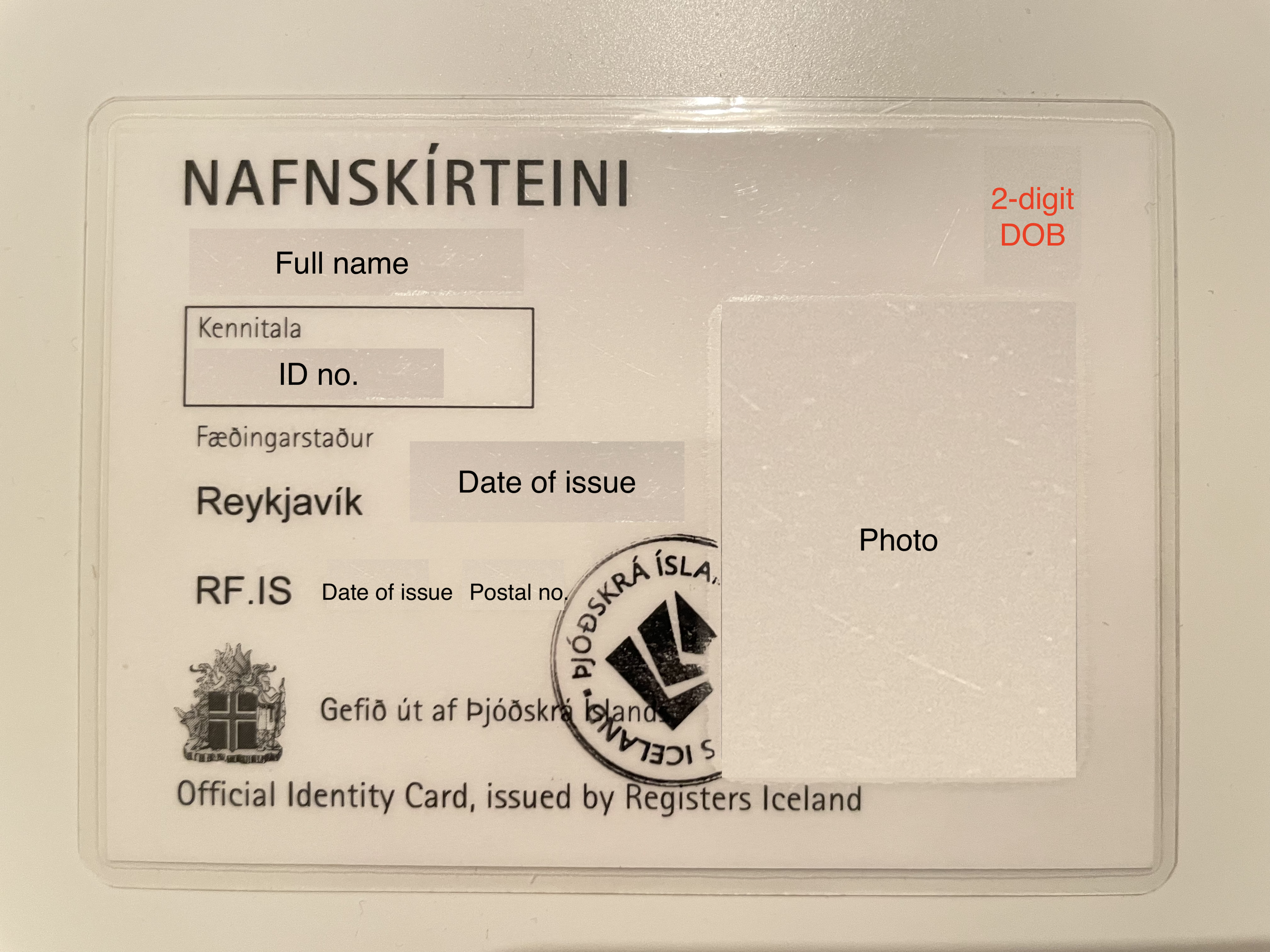
Card issued in the late 2010s

=== Debit and credit cards ===
In 1993, debit cards were launched which contained a picture and Icelandic ID number (thereby containing their date of birth) of the cardholder. These were intended for cashiers to verify the identity of the payor, acting as a cheque guarantee card. In 1995 the same applied to credit cards. As a result of their ubiquity and relative security compared to other forms of ID, bank-issued payment cards became a de facto form of domestic identification. In conjunction with over 90% of citizens possessing driving licences, Icelandic identity cards became somewhat redundant.

=== Need for a new ID card ===
There were plans in 2007 to introduce an updated ID card with a chip for eID capability and would have allowed their use abroad. The combined ID solution never came to fruition.

In 2019–2022, banks stopped printing ID photos and information on debit/credit cards. ID cards are important for citizens who live a car-free lifestyle or do not possess a passport, who previously relied on debit/credit cards as ID.

Icelandic ID cards issued by Registers Iceland were unchanged from their 1965 paper format and therefore relatively easy to falsify. In 2022 issues began to arise from fraudulent collections of pharmacy prescriptions by using falsified ID cards. Around the same time, the EU regulations on the design of national identity cards were enacted from 2019, necessitating an update of Icelandic ID cards.

=== New EU-Standard ID cards ===
New Icelandic identity cards were announced in 2022 and introduced on 5 March 2024. The new credit card-sized ID cards are biometric and comply with ICAO 9303 standards which allow the use of the Icelandic ID card to be used for travel across all countries in the EU/EFTA, which was not possible with previous cards. The cards remain voluntary.

Issuance of the card was transferred to local sheriffs. The new law also restricted the issuance to Icelandic citizens and introduced an issuance fee. The new cards are the first in the world to apply the new ICAO standard with a vertical format. Older ID cards issued before 2013 expired in December 2023 and cards issued before March 2024 will expire by 2026.

=== eID development ===
There was a limited roll out of digital IDs in 2000 to government and healthcare employees. In late 2008 eID smartcards (Icelandic: Einkaskilríki) were introduced more widely in the healthcare and accountant sectors. eID cards are issued separately to ID cards, and can be used with a smartcard reader linked to a PC. It was also previously possible to store one's eID on an EMV debit card. eIDs are administered by Auðkenni hf., which was initially created by a consortium of banks but is now owned by the government.

In November 2013 eIDs on SIM cards were introduced, which led to a much quicker take-up of due to its ease of use. By 2014, 40% of Icelanders were using eIDs, rising to 97% in 2022. Icelandic eIDs are not compatible with eSIMs, leading to issues for expats. To solve this, a new eID smartphone app was introduced in 2022.

== See also ==
- Icelandic passport
- Icelandic identification number
- Icelandic nationality law
- Visa requirements for Icelandic citizens
- National identity cards in the European Economic Area
- Norwegian identity card
