= Passports of the European Union =

Passports issued by European Union member states

Passports issued by the 27 member states of the European Union follow a common design and confer the rights of EU citizenship on their holders. The EU itself does not issue ordinary passports.

The design includes a burgundy cover (recommended by the EU; all member states except Croatia follow this recommendation). The front is stamped in the official language(s) of the issuing country, and sometimes also in English and French, with the title "European Union". This is followed by the name of the member state, the state's coat of arms, the word "PASSPORT", and the biometric passport symbol at the bottom centre of the cover.

Some member states also issue non-EU passports to people who hold a nationality that does not grant EU citizenship, such as Danish nationals resident in the Faroe Islands.

Separately, the European Commission issues the European Union Laissez-Passer to members and certain officials of its institutions.

Ordinary French passport showing the EU’s standard design features.

== Use ==
With a valid passport, EU citizens are entitled to exercise the right of free movement (meaning they do not need a visa, a certain amount of money, or a certain reason to travel freely and no residence permit for settling) in the European Economic Area (European Union, Iceland, Liechtenstein, and Norway), Switzerland and, before 31 December 2020 in the United Kingdom.

The passports of EU citizens are not stamped when entering and leaving the Schengen Area.

When going through border controls to enter an aforementioned country, citizens possessing valid biometric passports are sometimes able to use automated gates instead of immigration counters. For example, when entering the United Kingdom, at major airports, holders of EU biometric passports who are twelve years of age or older can use ePassport gates, whilst all other EU citizens (such as those using a national identity card or a non-biometric passport) and some non-EEA citizens must use an immigration counter. Anyone travelling with children under the age of 12 must also use an immigration counter.

As an alternative to holding a passport, EU citizens can also use a valid national identity card to exercise their right of free movement within the EEA and Switzerland. Strictly speaking, it is not necessary for an EU citizen to possess a valid passport or national identity card to enter the EEA or Switzerland. In theory, if an EU citizen outside of both the EEA and Switzerland can prove their nationality by any other means (e.g. by presenting an expired passport or national identity card, or a citizenship certificate), they must be permitted to enter the EEA or Switzerland. An EU citizen who is unable to demonstrate their nationality satisfactorily must nonetheless be given 'every reasonable opportunity' to obtain the necessary documents or to have them delivered within a reasonable period of time.

== Common design features ==
EU member states have harmonized passport designs since the 1980s. Most ordinary passports use a common layout: a burgundy cover with the words "European Union" and the name of the issuing state. Variants such as passport cards, diplomatic, service, and emergency passports are not standardized. Ireland is the only state to issue a passport card.

Since 28 February 2008, passports must contain fingerprint data. Croatia, which joined the EU in 2013, retained a dark blue cover when it updated its passport on 3 August 2015, making it the only member state not to use burgundy.

Council resolutions and EU regulations have guided the process:

- Resolution of 23 June 1981 on a uniform passport design
- Supplementary resolutions of 30 June 1982, 14 July 1986, 10 July 1995, and 8 June 2004
- Resolution of 17 October 2000 on passport security
- Council Regulation (EC) No 2252/2004 of 13 December 2004 on biometric standards
- Regulation (EC) No 444/2009 of 28 May 2009 amending Regulation 2252/2004

Under Regulation 2252/2004, all EU passports must include a facial image and two fingerprints, except for children under 12 and people unable to provide them. Denmark and Ireland are exempt from the fingerprint rule, though Irish passports include other biometric data.

=== Format ===
Passports follow the ISO 216 B7 format (ID-3, 88 × 125 mm). Most contain 32 pages; Finland issues 42 and Italy 48.

=== Cover ===
The cover normally shows, in order: "EUROPEAN UNION" (before 1997: "EUROPEAN COMMUNITY"), the name of the issuing state, the word "PASSPORT", the Biometric Passport symbol, and the state emblem. Placement of the emblem varies: above the text in some states, centred in others.

=== Identification page ===
The identification page presents information in the issuing state’s official language(s), plus English and usually French. Each field is numbered and explained in an index elsewhere in the booklet. The page includes the passport type ("P"), issuing country (ISO 3166-1 alpha-3) code, and passport number. The left side carries the main photo. Some passports also give height and a secondary security photo.

Irish passports show the county of birth for people born on the island of Ireland, and a three-letter country code for citizens born abroad.

=== Machine-readable zone ===
All biometric passports contain a machine-readable zone (MRZ) that repeats the main data in a restricted format of A–Z letters, digits, and the symbol "<". Non-Latin characters are transliterated using International Civil Aviation Organization (ICAO) rules. Examples include ß>SS, Ü>UE, Å>A, Ä>AE and Ö>OE.

Different transliterations can create multiple spellings of the same name (e.g. Müller / Mueller / Muller). Some states add the alternative spelling elsewhere in the passport. It is generally recommended to use the MRZ spelling for visas and airline tickets. The MRZ allows up to 39 characters.

=== Additional pages ===
Other pages may record residence, height, eye colour, passport extensions, or a birth name. Family passports can include details and photos of a spouse or children. Further pages are reserved for official notes, translations of field numbers, visas, and entry or exit stamps. The inside back cover may contain notes from the issuing state.

== Member states' passports ==
Member state	Passport cover	Biodata page	Cost	Validity	Issuing authority	Latest version
Austria			€112 (12+); €44 (0–11); Free (0–2, first issue)	10 years (12+); 5 years (2–11); 2 years (0–2)	Municipal offices; Austrian embassies and consulates	1 December 2023
Belgium			Belgium: €65 (adults, 32 pp); €35 (children, 32 pp); €240 (adults, 64 pp); €210 (children, 64 pp); Abroad: €75 (adults, 32 pp); €35 (children, 32 pp); €240 (adults, 64 pp); €210 (children, 64 pp)	7 years (18+); 5 years (under 18)	Communes; Belgian embassies and consulates	7 February 2022
Bulgaria			€20.45 (14–58); €10.23 (under 14; 58–70); €5.11 (70+)	5 or 10 years	Ministry of Interior	29 March 2010
Croatia			75€ (21+, 34 pages)	10 years (21+); 5 years (under 21)	Ministry of the Interior	3 August 2015
Cyprus			€70 (adults); €45 (minors)	10 years (adults); 5 years (minors)	Civil Registry and Migration Department; Embassies and High Commissions	24 July 2020
Czech Republic			CZK 600 (15+, in 30 d); CZK 100 (under 15); CZK 1200 (15+, abroad); CZK 400 (under 15, abroad)	10 years (15+); 5 years (under 15)	Town halls; Consulates	1 January 2012
Denmark			DKK 890 (18–64); DKK 378 (65+); DKK 178 (12–17); DKK 150 (0–11)	10 years (18+); 5 years (2–18); 2 years (0–2)	Municipalities	1 October 2021
Estonia			€40 (15+); €20 (under 15); €60 (15+ abroad); €20 (under 15 abroad)	10 years (15+); 5 years (under 15)	Police and Border Guard Board	1 January 2021
Finland			€50 (€44 online); €25 veterans (€22 online); €93 temporary	5 years	Police of Finland	13 March 2023
Finland, Åland Islands			€50 (€44 online); €25 veterans (€22 online); €93 temporary	5 years	Police of Åland	13 March 2023
France			€86 (adults, France/territories); €89 (adults abroad); €17 (0–14); €42 (15–17)	10 years (18+); 5 years (under 18)	Town halls; French consulates	13 April 2019
Germany			€70 (24+, 32 pp); €37.50 (under 24, 32 pp); €92 (24+, 48 pp); €59.50 (under 24, 48 pp)	10 years (24+); 6 years (under 24 or 2nd passport)	Municipal offices; Embassies and consulates	2 May 2024
Greece			€84.40 (adults); €73.60 (children)	10 years (14+); 3 years (under 14)	National Passport Centre	18 December 2023
Hungary			HUF 8,500 (under 12); HUF 12,500 (12-18); HUF 17,000 (18+)	3 years (under 6); 5 years (6-18); 10 years (18+)	Registration Office	1 February 2025
(Republic of Ireland) Ireland			€75 (adults, 32 pp); €20 (minors); €105 (adults, 66 pp)	10 years (adults); 5 years (children)	Passport Service, Department of Foreign Affairs	26 June 2026
Italy			€116 (48 pp, incl. revenue stamp)	10 years (18+); 5 years (3–18); 3 years (0–3)	Italian State Police; Poste Italiane; Consulates/embassies	27 September 2023
Latvia			€34 (21+); €15 (under 20, pensioners, disabled)	10 years (21+); 5 years (5–20); 2 years (under 5)	Office of Citizenship and Migration Affairs	12 February 2024
Lithuania			€50 (adults); €25 (minors); €10 (persons of retirement age)	10 years (16+); 5 years (5–15); 2 years (under 5); 1 year (if fingerprints temporarily cannot be captured)	Migration Department, Ministry of the Interior	20 May 2019
Luxembourg			€50 (5-year); €30 (2-year)	5 years (4+); 2 years (under 4)	Bureau des passeports	16 February 2015
Malta			€70–80 (16+, higher fee Apr–Aug); €40 (10–15); €16 (under 4)	10 years (16+); 5 years (10–15); 2 years (under 4)	Identity Malta; Embassies/High Commissions	15 November 2019
Netherlands			€83.87 (adults, 34 pp); €63.42 (minors, 34 pp); €139.40 (minors, abroad); €159.95 (adults, abroad); US$112.47 (minors, Caribbean Netherlands); US$134.78 (adults, Caribbean Netherlands)	10 years (18+); 5 years (under 18)	Municipalities; Ministry of Foreign Affairs	30 September 2024
Poland			PLN 140 (13–70); PLN 30 (under 13; 1-yr temporary); €110 (13–70 abroad); €70 (under 13 abroad); €40 (1-yr abroad); €15 (1-yr abroad, with regular application); Free (70+)	10 years (13+); 5 years (under 13); 1 year (temporary)	Provincial governors; Consuls	5 November 2018
Portugal			€65	5 years (5+); 2 years (under 5)	Portuguese consulates	10 July 2017
Romania			RON 265	10 years (18+); 5 years (12–18); 3 years (under 12); 1 year (temporary)	Ministry of Internal Affairs	4 September 2024
Slovakia			€50 (16+); €20 (6–16); €12 (under 6)	10 years (16+); 5 years (5–15); 2 years (under 5)	Ministry of Interior	17 September 2024
Slovenia			€46.10 (18+); €39.30 (3–18); €35.20 (under 3); €34.80 (1-yr special)	10 years (18+); 5 years (3–18); 3 years (under 3)	Ministry of the Interior	12 December 2016
Spain			€30	10 years (30+); 5 years (5–30); 2 years (under 5)	National Police Corps of Spain	2 January 2015
Sweden			SEK 500; SEK 1400 (embassies); SEK 1600 (temporary)	5 years	Swedish Police Authority; Embassies and consulates	1 January 2022

=== Former passports of the European Union ===
Following the UK's withdrawal from the European Union in January 2020, the UK and Gibraltar ceased to issue EU passports. British passports have now returned to their previous navy blue design, which first appeared in 1921. Non-EU navy blue passports were first issued in March 2020. Unlike previous designs the biodata page is now made of polycarbonate.

During the transition period, UK and Gibraltar passport were considered de facto EU passports, conferring on their holders the rights of EU citizens. After the end of the transition period on 1 January 2021, all UK passports have now lost this status.

Prior to the introduction of the blue UK passport in March 2020, the British passports conformed to the EU standard design. Between March 2019 and March 2020, passports were issued without the 'EUROPEAN UNION' header.

Former Member state or territory	Date of EU withdrawal	Passport cover	Biodata page	Validity	Issuing authority	Latest version
United Kingdom	31 January 2020	Current non-EU British passport.		10 years (aged 16 or over); 5 years (under 16)	HM Passport Office	December 2025
United Kingdom	31 January 2020	Previous EU passport design.		10 years (aged 16 or over); 5 years (under 16)	HM Passport Office	July 2019
(United Kingdom) Gibraltar	31 January 2020	Current design.		10 years (aged 16 or over); 5 years (under 16)	Gibraltar Civil Status and Registration Office	March 2020
(United Kingdom) Gibraltar	31 January 2020	Previous EU design.		10 years (aged 16 or over); 5 years (under 16)	Gibraltar Civil Status and Registration Office	July 2019

== Passport rankings ==
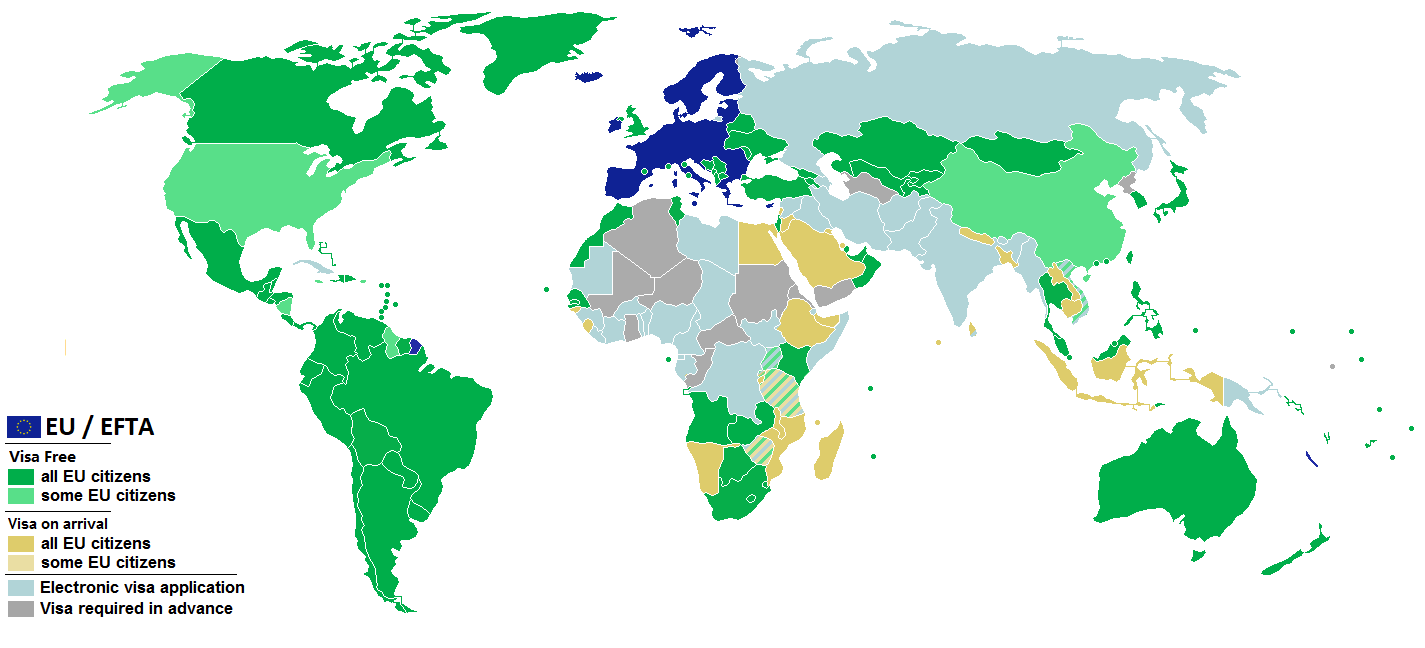
Visa requirements for European Union citizens

As of November 2026, the Henley Passport Index ranked passports by the number of countries and territories their holders could enter without a visa or with visa on arrival. In the European Union, Belgium, Denmark, Finland, France, Germany, Ireland, Italy, Luxembourg, Netherlands, Spain, and Sweden were tied for the highest ranking. Norway, a non-EU member of the European Economic Area, shared the same highest ranking, while Singapore held the top global position.

=== European Union member states ===
Country	Destinations (visa-free or visa on arrival)
Austria	184
Belgium	185
Bulgaria	177
Croatia	183
Cyprus	174
Czech Republic	182
Denmark	185
Estonia	182
Finland	185
France	185
Germany	185
Greece	184
Hungary	183
Ireland (Note: As of 2021, Irish citizens are the only nationality with the right to live and work in both the European Union and the United Kingdom.)	185
Italy	185
Latvia	182
Lithuania	181
Luxembourg	185
Malta	184
Netherlands	185
Poland	183
Portugal	184
Romania	177
Slovakia	183
Slovenia	183
Spain	185
Sweden	185

=== Selected non-EU and EEA countries ===
Country	Destinations (visa-free or visa on arrival)
Japan	188
Norway	185
Switzerland	184
United Kingdom	184
United States	180
Liechtenstein	180
Iceland	179

== Multiple and simultaneous passports ==
=== Same country ===
Some EU countries, such as Germany, France, Ireland, Malta and the Netherlands, allow their citizens to have several passports at once to circumvent certain travel restrictions. This can be useful if wanting to travel while a passport remains at a consulate while a visa application is processed, or wanting to apply for further visas while already in a foreign country. It can also be needed to circumvent the fact that visitors whose passports show evidence of a visit to Israel are not allowed to enter some Arab League nations

=== Multiple citizenship ===
Each EU member state can make its own citizenship laws, so some countries allow dual or multiple citizenship without any restrictions (e.g. Czech Republic, Denmark, France, Ireland, Italy, Sweden), some allow multiple citizenships but ignore existence of other citizenships within their borders (e.g. Poland), some regulate/restrict it (e.g. Austria, Netherlands), and others allow it only in exceptional cases (e.g. Lithuania) or only for citizens by descent (e.g. Croatia, Estonia, Slovenia, Spain).

== Emergency passports ==
Decision 96/409/CSFP of the Representatives of the Governments of the Member States meeting within the Council of 25 June 1996 on the establishment of an emergency travel document decided that there would be a standard emergency travel document (ETD).

ETDs are issued to European Union citizens for a single journey back to the EU country of which they are a national, to their country of permanent residence or, in exceptional cases, to another destination (inside or outside the Union). The decision does not apply to expired national passports; it is specifically restricted to cases where valid and unexpired passports have been lost, stolen, destroyed, or are temporarily unavailable (i.e. left somewhere else by accident).

Embassies and consulates of EU countries different to the applicant may issue emergency travel documents if

1. the applicant is an EU national whose passport or travel document has been lost, stolen, destroyed, or is temporarily unavailable;
2. the applicant is in a country in which the EU country of which they are a national has no accessible diplomatic or consular representation able to issue a travel document or in which the EU country in question is not otherwise represented;
3. clearance from the authorities of the applicant's country of origin has been obtained.

== Right to consular protection in non-EU countries ==
As a benefit of citizenship of the European Union, when in a non-EU country, EU citizens whose country maintains no diplomatic mission there have the right to consular protection and assistance from a diplomatic mission of any other EU country present in the non-EU country.

== Other EEA passports and Swiss passports ==
Like passports issued by EU member states, passports of other EEA states – Iceland, Liechtenstein, and Norway – as well as of Switzerland, can also be used to exercise the right of free movement within the European Economic Area and Switzerland.

As part of the Schengen agreement, passports and travel documents issued by member states shall comply with minimum security standards, and passports must incorporate a storage medium (a chip) that contains the holder's facial image and fingerprints. This obligation does not apply to identity cards or to temporary passports and travel documents with a validity of one year or less. Iceland, Norway, Switzerland, and Liechtenstein are bound by the rules (whereas Ireland is not), as Regulation (EC) No 2252/2004 constitutes a development of provisions of the Schengen acquis within the meaning of the Agreement concluded by the Council of the European Union and Iceland and Norway, the agreement concluded by the European Union, the European Community and the Swiss Confederation, and the Protocol signed between the European Union, the European Community, the Swiss Confederation and the Principality of Liechtenstein on the accession of the Principality of Liechtenstein to the Agreement between the European Union, the European Community and the Swiss Confederation, concerning the association of the four States with the implementation, application and development of the Schengen acquis .

== See also ==
- Visa requirements for European Union citizens
- Citizenship of the European Union
- National identity cards in the European Economic Area
- Passports in Europe
- Passports of the EFTA member states
- Passports of European Union candidate states
- Five Nations Passport Group
- Visa policy in the European Union
- Schengen Area
- European Union laissez-passer
- Public Register of Travel and Identity Documents Online
- False and Authentic Documents Online (FADO)
- Estonian alien's passport
- Non-citizens (Latvia)
