= Icelandic passport =

Passport for Iceland's citizens

Icelandic passport; Íslenskt vegabréf
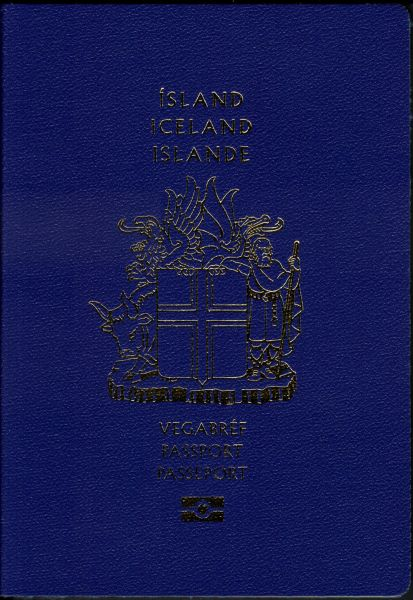
- The front cover of an Icelandic biometric passport issued from 2019.

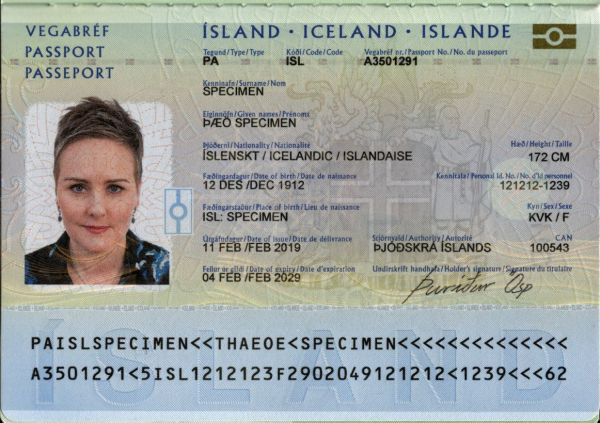
- The biodata page of an Icelandic biometric passport issued from 2019
- Type: Passport
- Issued by: Registers Iceland
- First issued: Early-1900s (first version); 1 June 1999 (machine-readable passport); 23 May 2006 (biometric); 1 February 2019 (current version)
- In circulation: 354.815 (94.9% of citizens)
- Purpose: Identification
- Eligibility: Icelandic citizenship
- Expiration: 5 years (Child aged 0-17) 10 years (Adult aged 18+)
- Cost: ISK7,000.00 (Child aged 0-17) ISK19,000.00 (Adult aged 18-66) ISK7,000.00 (Adult aged 67+) ISK7,000.00 (Disabled Adult)

Icelandic passports (Icelandic: íslenskt vegabréf) are issued to citizens of Iceland for the purpose of international travel. Beside serving as proof of Icelandic citizenship, they facilitate the process of securing assistance from Icelandic consular officials abroad (or public officials in the mission of another Nordic country in case an Icelandic consular official is absent).

As of 2023, 94.9% of Icelandic citizens possess an Icelandic passport. The only other official document issued by the Icelandic government stating Icelandic citizenship is the Icelandic identity card.

The passport allows for the freedom of movement in any of the states of EFTA and the EU/EEA. This is because Iceland is a member state of EFTA, and by virtue of it also being a member of the European Economic Area (EEA) and part of the Schengen Area. For travel within the Nordic countries no identity documentation is legally required for Nordic citizens due to the Nordic Passport Union.

== History ==
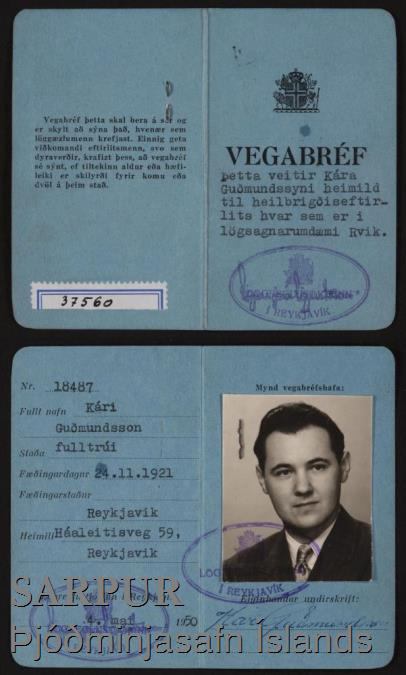
Icelandic domestic passport issued in the 1940s during WW2

In medieval times, while under the control of other Scandinavian powers, internal passports were required for certain individuals. The first legal instance of internal passports, then called Reisupassi or passi, were issued from 1781 for certain individuals travelling between regions of Iceland (mostly freemen). In the 19th century, the role of internal passports was questioned, progressively unenforced, and were officially repealed in 1907.

International passports have been issued since at least the early 1900s for travel but were uncommon, usually issued by the Reykjavík Police and consisted of a stamped photograph attached to a folded piece of paper. By the 1930s a standard international passport booklet was issued, in accordance with League of Nations standards, with a blue cover.

From 1929, a 'Nordic Travel Document' (Icelandic: Norræn ferðaskírteini) was also issued, for use only in Denmark, Sweden, Norway and Finland. They were cheaper than regular passports but were uncommon due to lax passport requirements in the Nordic countries and their issuance ceased at the outbreak of WWII.

=== Occupation passports ===
In 1941, during the British occupation of Iceland of the Second World War, emergency laws were introduced requiring domestic identification. From 1942 until 1945, a simplified paper card version of passports, essentially acting as identity documents, were issued by Icelandic police to all residents, who were required to carry them at all times. The design was different from international passport booklets, being a simple blue printed paper card with a photograph. The requirement to bear them at all times was abolished after the occupation.

=== Post-1950 ===
Some further iterations of Icelandic passports continued after WWII. Icelandic identity cards began to be issued in 1965. A new design was put into circulation in May 1987. It featured a dark blue (near-black) cover, laser-printed pages, and a laminated information page.

The first machine-readable Icelandic passports were introduced on 1 June 1999, including a new cover design, lighter blue colour, laminated biodata page and improved security features. In 2004, 81% of Icelandic citizens had a passport.

The first biometric passports were introduced in May 2006, with a middle hard-plastic page and the validity was temporarily shortened from ten years to five. In June 2013, the chip was relocated to the back cover and the validity was restored to ten years.

A new Icelandic passport design was introduced on 1 February 2019, featuring a slightly enlarged Icelandic coat of arms and sans-serif wording on the front cover, as well as a thinner top-laminate on the biodata page. They are manufactured by the Polish Security Printing Works (Polska Wytwórnia Papierów Wartościowych) in Poland.

== Physical Appearance ==
Icelandic passports are blue, with the Icelandic coat of arms emblazoned in the centre of the front cover. The words "ÍSLAND" (Icelandic), "ICELAND" (English) and "ISLANDE" (French) are inscribed above the coat of arms and the words "VEGABRÉF" (Icelandic), "PASSPORT" (English) and "PASSEPORT" (French) are inscribed below the coat of arms. Icelandic passports have the standard biometric symbol at the bottom.

Vegabréf, the Icelandic word for passport, literally means "road letter", which was the Scandinavian word for internal passports when such existed in Scandinavia.

=== Identity Information Page ===
The biodata page of the previous machine readable version

The Icelandic passport includes the following data:

- Photo of Passport Holder
- Type (PA)
- Code (ISL)
- Passport No.
- Surname
- Given Names
- Nationality
- Height
- Date of Birth
- Icelandic Identification Number
- Sex
- Place of Birth
- Signature
- Date of Issue
- Date of Expiry
- Authority (ÞJÓÐSKRÁ)

The information page ends with the Machine Readable Zone.

=== Different spellings of the same name ===
Personal names containing the special Icelandic letters (ð, þ, æ, ö) are spelled the correct way in the non-machine-readable zone, but are mapped in the machine-readable zone. ð becomes D, þ becomes TH, æ becomes AE, and ö becomes OE.
Letters with accents are replaced by simple letters (e.g., é → E). This follows the standard for machine-readable passports.

=== Languages ===
The data page/information page is printed in Icelandic, English and French.

== Visa free travel ==
Visa requirements for Icelandic citizens Iceland Freedom of movement Visa free Visa issued upon arrival eVisa Visa available both on arrival or online Visa required prior to arrival

Visa requirements for Icelandic citizens are administrative entry restrictions by the authorities of other states placed on citizens of Iceland. As of April 5 2025, Icelandic citizens have visa-free or visa-on-arrival access to 182 countries and territories, ranking the Icelandic passport 10th in the world in terms of travel freedom (tied with Lithuanian passport) according to the Henley Passport Index.

As a member of the European Free Trade Association (EFTA), Icelandic citizens have freedom of movement to live and work in other EFTA countries in accordance with the EFTA convention. Moreover, by virtue of Iceland's membership of the European Economic Area (EEA), Icelandic citizens also enjoy freedom of movement within all EEA member states. The Citizens’ Rights Directive defines the right of free movement for citizens of the EEA, and all EFTA and EU citizens are not only visa-exempt but are legally entitled to enter and reside in each other's countries. The Icelandic ID card alone can also be used to exercise free movement rights within the EEA and EFTA.

== Other identity documents ==
Inside Iceland and the other Nordic countries, an Icelandic identity card or Icelandic driving licence is sufficient for personal identification. Driving licences do not state citizenship and therefore are not usable in most cases as travel documentation.

The Icelandic identity cards, called Nafnskírteini, were updated in 2024 adhering to biometric ICAO and EU standards, allowing its use to exercise free movement throughout the EU/EEA/EFTA, as well as a number of other European countries.

== See also ==
- Icelandic nationality law
- Visa requirements for Icelandic citizens
- Icelandic identity card
- Driving licence in Iceland
- Passports of the EFTA member states
