= European Union laissez-passer =

Travel document

- The front cover of a European Union laissez-passer incorporating machine-readable and biometric features.

- Type: Laissez-Passer
- Issued by: EU institutions
- First issued: 1970s
- Purpose: Identification
- Eligibility: EU officials

A European Union laissez-passer is a travel document issued to civil servants and members of the institutions of the European Union. It is proof of privileges and immunities the holders enjoy. The document is valid in all countries of the European Union as well as in over 100 other countries. In 2006, the European Commission issued or renewed 2,200 laissez-passer, and other agencies may issue the document as well.

The present regulation was proposed by the European Commission implementing machine-readable laissez-passer according to ICAO 9303 standard including a digitized photo of the bearer's face and fingerprints. The number of data fields was reduced and the document no longer contains information on address and physical appearance.

== History ==
Provisions for issuing laissez-passer were already present in the treaties establishing the European Coal and Steel Community, the European Atomic Energy Community and the European Economic Community and a single European Community laissez-passer was established at the beginning of the 1970s. As a result of the Maastricht Treaty, the name was changed to European Union laissez-passer. The initial laissez-passer was available in all four languages of the communities (French, German, Dutch and Italian), but not in English. Subsequent extensions changed the number of languages to the present 24.

== Appearance ==
The document contains 48 pages and all text is in all 24 official languages.

A data page has a visual zone and a machine-readable zone. The visual zone has a photograph of the holder, data about the passport, and data about the LP holder much similar to a normal passport. The code EUE for European Union is used in fields similar to issuing country.

- Photograph
- Type [of document, which is "PL"]
- Code [of the issuing organization, which is "EUE" for "European Union"]
- Laissez-passer Nº.
- Surname
- Given Name(s)
- Official of / Nationality [EUE / nationality code]
- Date of Birth
- Place of Birth
- Sex
- Date of Issue
- Date of Expiry
- Signature

The first line of a machine-readable zone (which is at the bottom of the page) of the passport contains a letter to denote the type of travel document (which is "PL"), followed by the code normally used for the issuing country (but here: "EUE" for "European Union"), and the name (surname first, then given name or names) of the passport holder.

In a similar fashion to most passports, the EU laissez-passer contains a request:

Authorities of non-EU countries are hereby requested to allow the holder to pass freely without hindrance.

== See also ==
- United Nations laissez-passer
- Passports of the European Union
- Public Register of Authentic Travel and Identity Documents Online (PRADO)
