= Icelandic identification number =

Icelandic national identification number

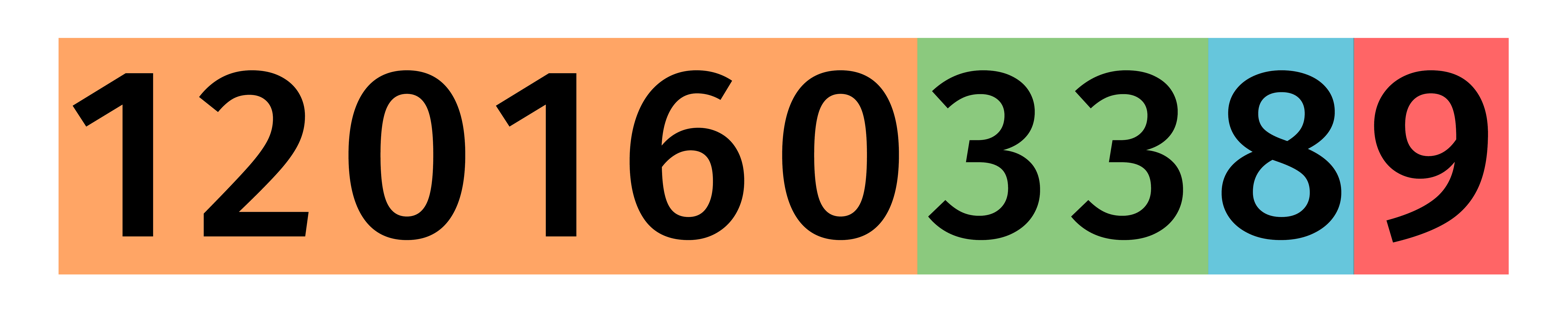
A mockup Icelandic identification number (kennitala) used to demonstrate how it's constructed. Birth date (DDMMYY) Random number (20 to 99) Checksum Birth century indicator

The Icelandic identification number (Icelandic: kennitala, abbreviated kt.) is the Icelandic national identification number. It is widely used to identify individuals and organisations in Iceland.

The ID numbers are administered by Registers Iceland (Iceland's civil registry). ID numbers are issued to Icelandic citizens at birth, and to foreign nationals resident in Iceland upon registration. They are also issued to corporations and institutions.

== History ==
The current identification number system was introduced in 1987, replacing the previous system, nafnnúmer, which was retired on 1 January 1988. The previous system sorted names alphabetically for nationals based on their order in the alphabet. The old system posed issues, such as requiring number changes for name changes, and causing delays in assigning ID numbers to children. After 1980, number shortages led to the reuse of deceased persons' names, causing occasional problems in the health and education system.

== Format ==
The number is composed of ten digits. For a personal ID number, the first six of these are the individual's date of birth in the format DDMMYY. The identification numbers assigned to companies (and other legal entities) can be distinguished by the fact that the DD component is always greater than that for individuals. This is attributed to the addition of the number 40, resulting in the initial digit being 4, 5, 6, or 7.

The seventh and eighth digits are randomly chosen when the ID number is allocated, ranging from 20 to 99 (with some exceptions). The ninth is a check digit, and the tenth indicates the century of the individual's birth: '9' for 1900–1999, '0' for 2000–2099. ID numbers are often written with a hyphen following the first six digits, e.g. 120174–3399.

D_{1}D_{2}M_{1}M_{2}Y_{1}Y_{2}R_{1}R_{2}PC
D = day, M = month, Y = year, R = random, P = parity, C = century.

The consequence of this design is that at most 80 people can be born on the same day. To address this issue, there are plans to discontinue the use of a check digit.

=== Checksum ===
The check digit equation is based on Modulus 11, and is as follows:

$P_0 = (3 D_1 + 2 D_2 + 7 M_1 + 6 M_2 + 5 Y_1 + 4 Y_2 + 3 R_1 + 2 R_2) \bmod 11$

$$P =
\begin{cases}
0 & \text{if }P_0 = 0 \\
11 - P_0 & \text{otherwise }
\end{cases}$$

The same formula is used for the identification numbers of organisations and companies.

== Use ==
The system is similar to that employed by some other European countries, but Iceland makes unusually extensive and public use of its ID numbers, with businesses, educational and medical institutions eschewing internal identification numbers in favour of the national system, and its use being mandated in banking transactions. In most cases, instead of a business issuing a customer or account number, the ID number is used. Even the flag-carrier airline Icelandair uses the national ID numbering system for frequent flier numbers.

Furthermore, online banking services in Iceland offer a lookup service to check names against numbers. Because of their public nature, ID numbers are not used for authentication. The completeness of the National Register has eliminated the need for the country to conduct a regular census: population statistics can be obtained by simply querying the database.

The introduction of electronic IDs (eIDs) has reinforced the extensive use of the ID number in everyday life. Institutions and companies alike use the eID, tied to an ID number, to login and authenticate users, by use of a mobile app. For example, the process of logging into the healthcare portal is the same as logging into a subscription TV account, as they are tied to the same ID number.

The Icelandic ID number is displayed on all official identity documents: Icelandic identity cards, Icelandic passports and Icelandic driving licences, as well as most official documents, bills and registrations.

One issue is that having an ID number is usually a prerequisite to accessing most government services, banking services and even some businesses transactions. This can be a hindrance to newly settled residents, as it takes some time to apply and be issued a new ID number.

=== System identification number ===
A System Identification Number (Icelandic: Kerfiskennitala) can be issued to individuals from the EEA/EFTA who do not intend to establish permanent residence in Iceland, but need an ID no. for tax or other purposes.

== See also ==
- National identification numbering in Iceland
- Icelandic identity card
- Icelandic passport
- Icelandic driving licence
