= National identity cards in the European Economic Area and Switzerland =

Identity cards issued by member states of the European Economic Area

National identity card
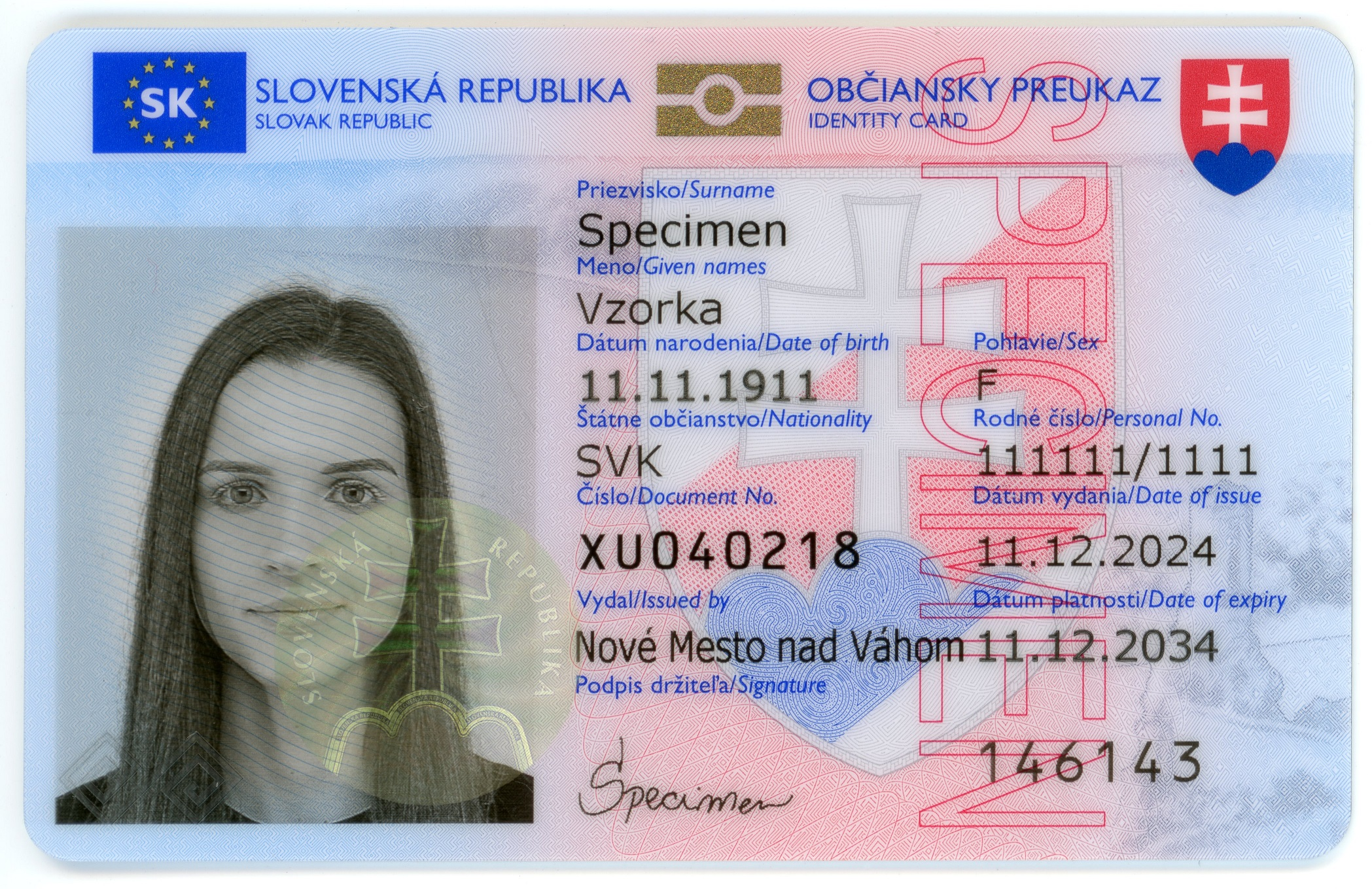
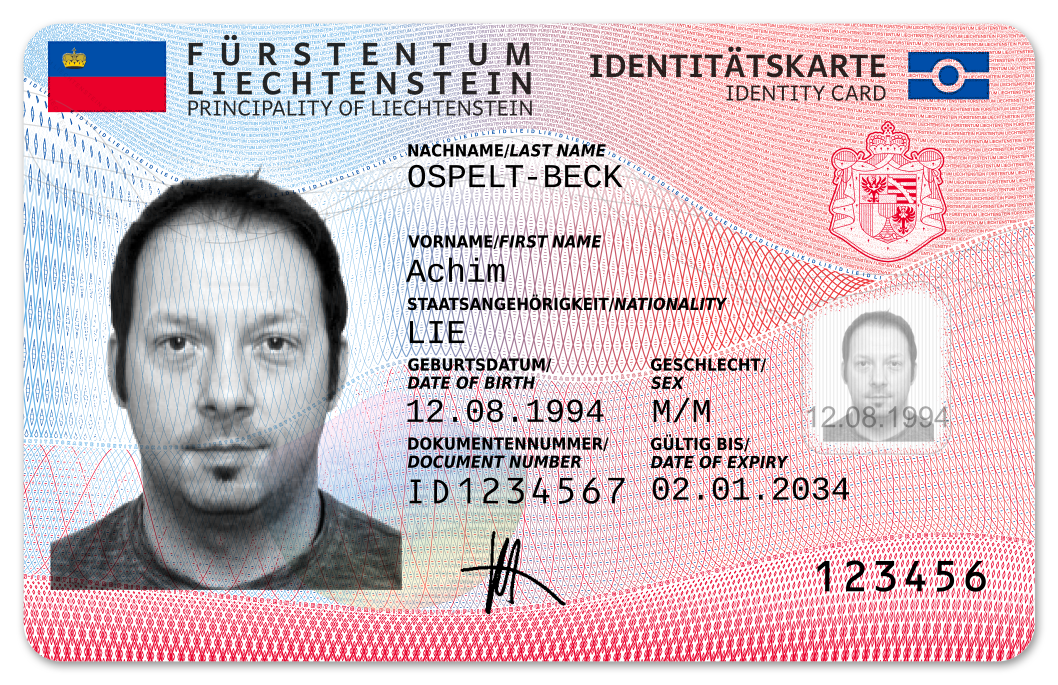
- Examples of European standard ID cards issued in Slovakia (EU) and Liechtenstein (EFTA). ID cards issued in EFTA countries do not feature the EU flag.
- Type: Identity card
- Issued by: (European Union) Member states of the European Economic Area; Switzerland
- First issued: 2 August 2021 (new EU standard)
- In circulation: 53 million (2023, new EU standard); ~200 million (total)
- Valid in: EU and EFTA Various other countries and territories depending on the country of issue
- Eligibility: Citizens of the European Economic Area and Switzerland
- Expiration: New cards: Maximum 10 years Non-MRZ: 2 Aug 2026 Non-EU standard: 2 Aug 2031
- Size: ID-1

National identity cards are identity documents issued to citizens of European Union and European Economic Area (EEA) member states, with the exception of Denmark and Ireland (the latter, however, issues a passport card). A new common identity card model harmonized the various formats in use from 2 August 2021 and older ID cards are currently being phased out according to Council Regulation (EU) 2025/1208.

As of 2021, there are approximately two hundred million national identity cards in use in the EU/EEA. They are compulsory in fifteen countries, voluntary in eleven countries and in five countries they are semi-compulsory (possession of some ID is required).

Citizens holding a national identity card, which states citizenship of an EEA member state or Switzerland, can use it as an identity document within their home country, and as a travel document to exercise the right of free movement in the EEA and Switzerland. However, identity cards that do not state citizenship of an EEA member state or Switzerland, including residence permits or residence cards issued to non-citizens, are not valid as travel documents within the EEA and Switzerland.

== Use ==
=== Travel document ===
EU state, national ID card issued EFTA member, national ID card issued EU state, passport card issued (Ireland) EU state, no national ID card issued (Denmark) Accepts EU/EFTA national ID cards Accepts some EU/EFTA national ID cards (or under certain conditions)

As an alternative to presenting a passport, EEA and Swiss citizens are entitled to use a valid national identity card as a stand-alone travel document to exercise their right of free movement in the European Economic Area and Switzerland. National identity card ownership in most EU countries and Switzerland is much more widespread than passport ownership.

When travelling within the Nordic Passport Union, no identity documentation is legally required by Nordic citizens. When travelling within the Common Travel Area (UK and Ireland), other valid identity documentation (such as a driving licence) is often sufficient for Irish and British citizens.

As of 2024, Denmark is the only state that does not issue identity cards that are valid as travel documents in the EEA member states and Switzerland. Strictly speaking, it is not necessary for an EEA or Swiss citizen to possess a valid national identity card or passport to enter the EEA and Switzerland. In theory, if an EEA or Swiss citizen can prove their nationality by any other means (e.g. by presenting an expired national identity card or passport, or a citizenship certificate), they must be permitted to enter the EEA and Switzerland. An EEA or Swiss citizen who is unable to demonstrate their nationality satisfactorily must, nonetheless, be given 'every reasonable opportunity' to obtain the necessary documents or to have them delivered within a reasonable period of time.

Additionally, EEA and Swiss citizens can enter the following countries and territories outside the EEA and Switzerland on the basis of their national identity cards alone, without the need to present a passport to the border authorities:

- Akrotiri and Dhekelia (Note: The British Sovereign Base Areas of Akrotiri and Dhekelia has no border control to Cyprus and follows the visa policy of the Schengen Area, but requires permits for stays longer than 28 days per 12-month period. These rules were not affected by Brexit.)
- Albania
- Andorra
- Bosnia and Herzegovina (Note: National ID cards only accepted for short-term visits, and a passport is required to take up residency.)
- Faroe Islands (Note: Open border with the Schengen Area due to open borders with the Nordic countries (Nordic Passport Union). Citizens of EU/EFTA countries can use an ID card.) (Note: Except for Nordic citizens, national ID cards are only accepted for short-term visits, and a passport is required to take up residency)
- (France) French overseas territories
- Georgia (excluding Abkhazia and South Ossetia) (Note: Not valid for Norwegian or Icelandic citizens.)
- Gibraltar (Note: No borders between Spain and Gibraltar. For further information, see: Schengen Area § Gibraltar.)
- Kosovo
- Moldova
- Monaco (Note: Monaco is de facto part of the Schengen Area under an arrangement with France, while San Marino and Vatican City are enclaves of Italy with open land borders. For further information, see: Schengen Area § Status of the European microstates.)
- Montenegro
- Montserrat (Note: Up to 14 days and only for passengers in transit to another destination. French citizens can visit Montserrat up to 6 months with their ID cards, if in possession of a return ticket to their origin country. (as stated at page 69, Section 17 of Chapter 13.01 Immigration Act))
- North Cyprus
- North Macedonia
- San Marino
- Serbia (Note: Not valid for Liechtenstein citizens.)
- Transnistria
- Vatican City

Turkey allows citizens of Belgium, Bulgaria, France, Germany, Greece, Hungary, Italy, Liechtenstein, Luxembourg, Malta, the Netherlands, Poland, Portugal, Romania, Spain and Switzerland using a national identity card for short-term visits.

Similarly, Egypt allows citizens of Belgium, France, Germany, Italy, and Portugal to enter using a national identity card for short-term visits.

Anguilla, Dominica, Saint Lucia, Guernsey and Jersey allow citizens of France to enter using a national ID card, as well as Mauritius (only French citizens residing in Réunion) and Canada (only residing in Saint Pierre and Miquelon)

The Gambia allows citizens of Belgium to enter using a national ID card.

Greenland allows citizens of Denmark, Finland, Iceland, Norway and Sweden to use any identification document containing a photo.

Morocco allows EU citizens to enter with a national ID card on certain guided day trips by ferry from Spain to Tangier, offered by ferry operator Balearia and various Spanish tour operators.

The United Kingdom and the Crown Dependencies allow EU, EEA and Swiss citizens to use national identity cards for entry if they have rights under the Withdrawal Agreement, which applies generally to EU/EFTA citizens residing in the UK before Brexit. Under the Brexit withdrawal agreement, the United Kingdom has an option to cease accepting identity cards that do not comply with ICAO biometric specifications after 31 December 2025; as of 2026, the UK government states that such non-compliant cards 'can... continue to be used until announced otherwise'.

According to their local laws, Swedish and Finnish citizens cannot leave their country directly for a non-EU/EFTA country with only their ID cards.

==== Additional checks for some citizens ====
At the external border crossing points of the Schengen Area, if a traveller presents a travel document without a machine readable zone and the border guard has 'doubt about his/her identity', the traveller may be requested to undergo a more in-depth 'second line' check. This problem should be resolved, because this kind of document is forbidden for all European Union citizens from 3 August 2026 onwards.

With effect from 7 April 2017, it is mandatory for border guards in the Schengen Area to check on a systematic basis the travel documents of all EEA and Swiss citizens crossing external borders against relevant databases. Until 7 April 2017, border guards in the Schengen Area were only obliged to perform a 'rapid' and 'straightforward' visual check for signs of falsification and tampering, and were not obliged to use technical devices – such as document scanners, UV light and magnifiers – when EEA and Swiss citizens presented their passports or national identity cards at external border checkpoints. (Note: Article 7(2) of the Schengen Borders Code in force until 6 April 2017 (32006R0562). The amended Schengen Borders Code entered into effect on 7 April 2017.) They were not legally obliged to check the passports/national identity cards of EEA and Swiss citizens against a database of lost/stolen/invalidated travel documents (and, if they did so, they could only perform a 'rapid' and 'straightforward' database check, and could only check to see if the traveller was on a database containing persons of interest on a strictly 'non-systematic' basis where such a threat was 'genuine', 'present' and 'sufficiently serious').

According to statistics published by Frontex, in 2015 the top 6 EU member states whose national identity cards were falsified and detected at external border crossing points of the Schengen Area were Italy, Spain, Belgium, Greece, France and Romania. These countries remained the top 6 in 2016.

=== Identification document ===
Identity documentation requirements for citizens National identity card required Some form of identity documentation required Identity documentation optional

Usage in own country

There are varying rules on domestic usage of identity documents. Some countries demand the usage of the national identity card or a passport. Other countries allow usage of other documents like driver's licences.

In eleven countries, national identity cards are fully voluntary and not needed by everyone, as identity documents like driving licences are accepted domestically. In some of these countries, e.g. Austria, Finland, Sweden and Iceland, only a minority have a national identity card, since a majority use a passport or driving licence for identification purposes and do not need more identity documents. Similarly, the same happens also in Ireland where the Passport Card is voluntary. On the contrary, in other countries like France or Italy, the national identity card is very widespread, even if any state-issued document is equally accepted.

However, even in those EEA countries that impose a national identity card requirement on their citizens, it is generally not required to carry the identity cards at all times.

Usage outside own country

EEA and Swiss citizens exercising their right of free movement in another EEA member state or Switzerland are entitled to use their national identity card as an identification document when dealing not just with government authorities, but also with private sector service providers. For example, where a supermarket in the Netherlands refuses to accept a German national identity card as proof of age when a German citizen attempts to purchase an age-restricted product and insists on the production of a Dutch-issued passport or driving licence or other identity document, the supermarket would, in effect, be discriminating against this individual on this basis of their nationality in the provision of a service, thereby contravening the prohibition in Art 20(2) of Directive 2006/123/EC of discriminatory treatment relating to the nationality of a service recipient in the conditions of access to a service which are made available to the public at large by a service provider. In those EEA countries whose citizens are required by law to obtain a national identity card, only a minority have a passport, since it is not needed for travelling across much of Europe.

Usage in third countries

National identity cards are often accepted in other parts of the world for unofficial identification purposes (such as age verification in commercial establishments that serve or sell alcohol, or checking in at hotels) and sometimes for official purposes such as proof of identity and nationality to authorities (especially machine-readable cards).

=== Electronic identity cards (eID) ===
As of 2024, all EU/EEA countries (except Denmark) issue national identity cards with contact and/or contactless (NFC) smart card functionality. The regulation dictates that the eID functions must be logically or physically separate from the ICAO biometric function of the card.

Digital signature applications can be used which enables the bearer to authenticate themselves digitally using their identity card. Consequently, they can authenticate documents to satisfy any third party that the document's not been altered after being digitally signed, as well as to identify the identity card holder. This application uses a registered certificate in conjunction with public/private key pairs so these enhanced cards do not necessarily have to participate in online transactions. This can be achieved by using a smartcard reader paired with a computer (for contact and contactless cards), or via the NFC interface present in many smartphones (for contactless cards).

A growing number of EU countries have introduced dedicated mobile apps, linked to state registries, that replace physical identity cards. In 2024, the EU passed regulations aimed at standardising electronic identities also through mobile wallets.

== Common design and security features ==
=== European Union standards from 2006 ===
On 4 December 2006, all European Union member states agreed to adopt common designs and minimum security standards for national identity cards that were in the draft resolution of 15 November 2006: This included laminated paper core cards and cards made of a synthetic substrate. The standard specified minimum biographical information (including doc. no., validity, signature), machine readability and ICAO conformity.

EU Regulations from April 2017 revising the Schengen Borders Code, introduced systematic checks of travel documents of EU, EEA and Swiss citizens against relevant databases when entering and leaving the Schengen Area, and states that all member states should phase out national identity cards which are not machine-readable.

=== New European Union standards ===
Regulation 2025/1208
- European Union regulation
- Text with EEA relevance
- Title: Council Regulation (EU) 2025/1208 of 12 June 2025 on strengthening the security of identity cards of Union citizens and of residence documents issued to Union citizens and their family members exercising their right of free movement
- Made by: Council
- Made under: Art. 77(3) TFEU
- Journal reference: OJ L, 2025/1208

History
- Council Vote: 12 June 2025
- Date made: 12 June 2025
- Entry into force: 10 July 2025
- Applies from: 10 July 2025

Preparative texts
- Commission proposal: 23 July 2024

Other legislation
- Replaces: Regulation (EU) 2019/1157

In 2019, the European Parliament and the Council of the European Union adopted a new regulation with a new common format of identity cards. The purpose of the regulation was to replace and harmonize the various identity card models currently in use in Europe. The regulation began to apply to the European Union (EU) on 2 August 2021 and the European Economic Area (EEA) from 1 February 2024. (Note: The legal acquis has been identified as EEA-relevant by the EU Commission, which makes it under scrutiny for incorporation into the EEA Agreement by Iceland, Liechtenstein and Norway. However, the legal basis rely on Article 21 of the Treaty on the Functioning of the European Union, an article which is not reflected in the EEA Agreement.)

However, the regulation was declared invalid by the European Court of Justice (ECJ) in March 2024 as it had been adopted on an incorrect legal basis. It was to remain in force until, at the latest, 31 December 2026 so that the council could adopt a new regulation on the correct legal basis.

On 23 July 2024, the European Commission published a new legal act that meets the requirements of the ECJ. Its content is almost identical to that of the contested legal act. On 12 June 2025, the new legal act was unanimously adopted by the Council of the European Union and entered into force on 10 July 2025.

All EU and EEA member states are required to issue identity cards according to the Council Regulation, except Denmark due to their opt-out from the area of freedom, security and justice.

Requirements for identity cards are given in Council Regulation (EU) 2025/1208 which states that:

- Identity cards shall be produced in ID-1 format and shall contain a machine-readable zone (MRZ).
- Security standards shall be based on ICAO Document 9303.
- The document shall bear the title 'Identity card' in the official language and in at least one other official language of the institutions of the Union.
- It shall contain the two-letter country code of the Member State issuing the card, printed in negative in a blue rectangle and encircled by 12 yellow stars (EU Flag) on the front side. (Requirement of the EU flag does not apply in Norway, Iceland and Liechtenstein)
- It shall include a 9-character long document number.
- It shall include a highly secure storage medium which shall contain a facial image of the holder of the card and two fingerprints in interoperable digital formats. The storage medium shall have sufficient capacity and capability to guarantee the integrity, the authenticity and the confidentiality of the data. The data stored shall be accessible in contactless form and secured as provided for in Implementing Decision C(2018) 7767 as amended by Implementing Decision C(2021) 3726.
- Identity cards shall have a minimum period of validity of 5 years and a maximum period of validity of 10 years. But Member States may provide for a period of validity of less than 5 years for minors and more than 10 years for persons aged 70 and above.
- Identity cards which do not meet the new requirements shall cease to be valid at their expiry or by 3 August 2031.
- Identity cards which do not meet the minimum security standards or which do not include a functional MRZ shall cease to be valid at their expiry or by 3 August 2026.
- Identity cards of persons aged 70 and above at 2 August 2021, which meet the minimum security standards and which have a functional MRZ shall cease to be valid at their expiry.

Article 16 states that this Regulation shall apply from 10 July 2025.

Examples of the new design standard

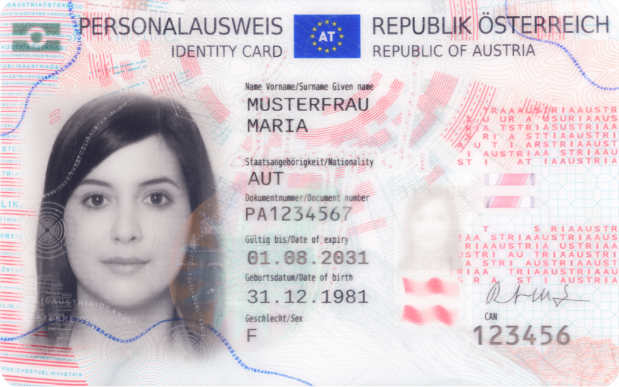
Austrian identity card

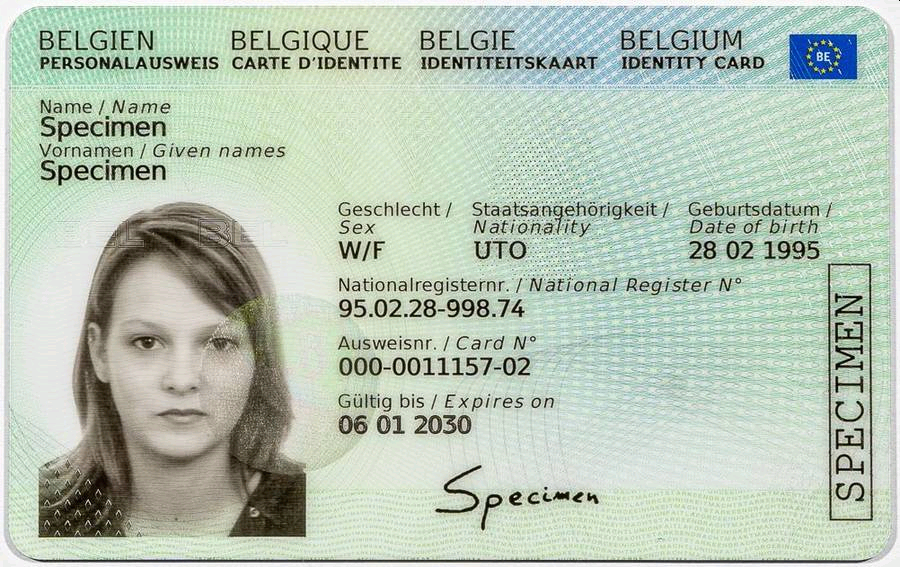
Belgian identity card

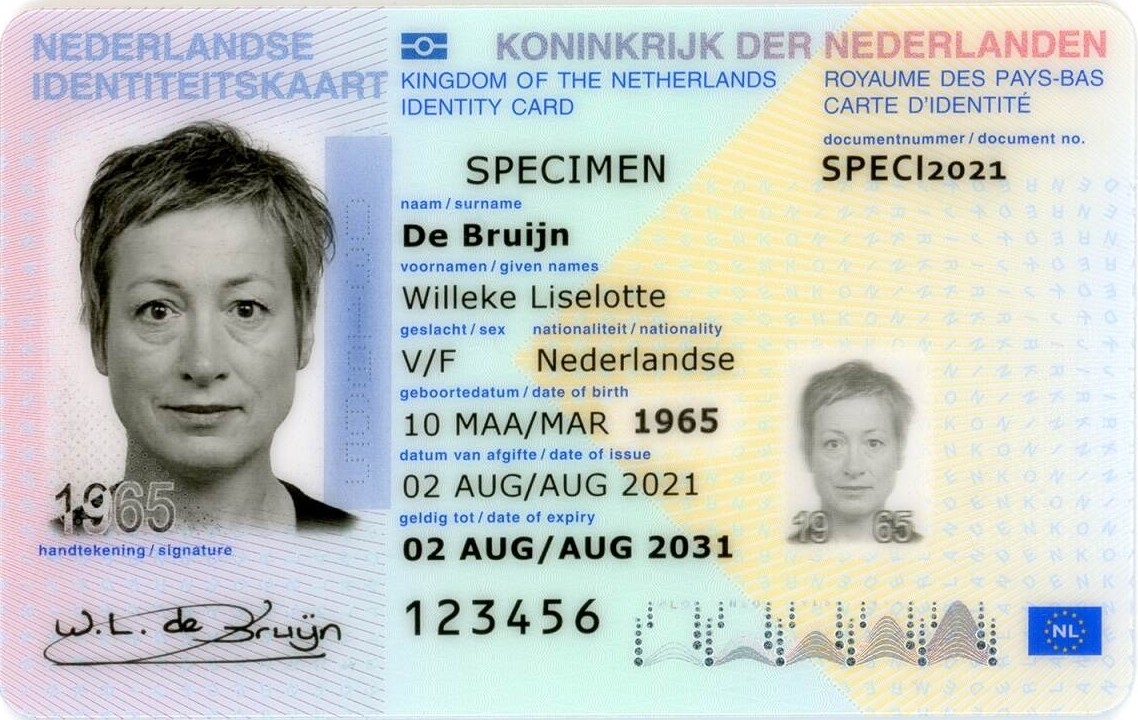
Dutch identity card

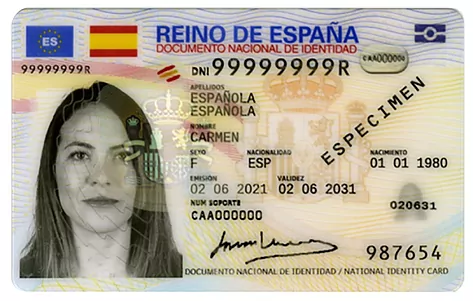
Spanish identity card

For several member countries the new requirements do not mean that the design or features of the existing cards change much, since they mostly fulfil the requirements already. For some this means a large redesign. A visible change for all countries is the country code inside the EU flag.

ICAO/EU identity cards have an identifying initial character of either A,C or I. in the MRZ on the obverse side. All EU/EEA identity cards have the initial identifying characters ID or I< except Italy, Ireland, Cyprus and Norway. Croatia uses IO. However, Italy and Norway use the initial character C for their identity cards. Irish passport cards, which are not identity cards, have the initial identifying characters IP in common with the United States passport card.

Cyprus began issuing identity cards conforming to the harmonised requirements as early as August 2020, becoming the first country to implement the new standard, followed by Malta the same month. Implementation throughout the member states progressed gradually and was completed when Portugal and Bulgaria implemented the new standards in June 2024. In 2019, the EU estimated that around 80 million ID cards in circulation were not machine-readable, and will therefore expire in 2026.

==== Cards issued by EEA states ====
As a result of the EEA agreement, in February 2024, Norway, Iceland and Liechtenstein became bound by Regulation 2019/1157 with some special provisions, including the lack of a requirement of an EU flag. Norwegian identity cards have been compliant with the regulation since July 2021. Liechtenstein began issuing biometric EU-standard ID cards in January 2024. Iceland began to issue new EU-standard ID cards in March 2024, the first in the world to use the new additional ICAO 9303 format with a vertical format. Identity cards issued by EEA states are equally as valid as EU identity cards within the EU and EFTA.

==== Non-compliant cards ====
Denmark, Ireland and Switzerland do not issue cards compliant to the Council Regulation (EU) 2025/1208, for different reasons outlined below.

Danish identity cards are issued by municipalities, each having their own design, and are not accepted as valid travel documents outside Denmark. They were launched in 2017, replacing previous 'Youth Cards'. Since 2018 the nationality of the cardholder has been included, which briefly allowed the card to be used for travel to Sweden. However, in September 2019, Swedish authorities explicitly banned Danish municipal identity cards from being used for entry, due to their low level of security. Danish municipal ID cards are mostly only valid for proof of age requirements. In 2021, the Danish Ministry of Interior concluded that more secure national ID cards were not on the agenda due to costs.

Ireland does not issue identity cards, but issues a passport card on an optional basis only to those who have an Irish passport booklet. Recital 12 of the EU Regulation states that it does not apply to Irish passport cards because they do not serve identification purposes in the issuing member state. Irish passport cards nevertheless follow the ICAO 9303 standard and are biometrically compliant (minus eID functionality) but do not feature the EU flag. However, "European Union" does appear on them.

Swiss national identity cards are not subject to the EU Regulation; however, they are machine-readable but do not contain biometric data. Nevertheless, they are valid for travel across the EU and EEA due to bilateral agreements and the Schengen acquis. Following an update to the Swiss-EU bilateral Agreement on the Free Movement of Persons, biometric ID cards complying with the standard have been introduced on 2 November 2026, alongside the non-biometric version.

== Overview of national identity cards ==
Member states issue a variety of national identity cards with differing technical specifications and according to differing issuing procedures. In most member states, cards can be issued abroad through the country's respective consulates.

Member state	Smart card interface	Front	Reverse	Compulsoriness	Cost	Validity	Issuing authority	Latest version
Austria	Contactless			Identity documentation is optional	€91 (applicants aged 16 or over); €39 (children under 16)	10 years (ages >12); 5 years (ages 2–11); 2 years (<2)	Statutory cities or district commissions	2 August 2021
Belgium	Contact Contactless			National identity card compulsory for Belgian citizens aged 12 or over	Differs per city; equivalent of €11 or €17 in local currency (citizens registered abroad)	6 years (ages 12 to 18); 10 years (age >18)	Municipality	15 July 2021
Bulgaria	Contactless			National identity card compulsory for Bulgarian citizens aged 14 or over	first card free (age 14–16); €6.65 (age 14–17) for 30-day issue, €13.29 for 3-day issue; €9.20 (age 18–69) for 30-day issue, €18.41 for 3-day issue; free (age 70+)	4 years (age 14–17); 10 years (age 18–69); 10 or 30 years (age 70+)	The police on behalf of the Ministry of the Interior	17 June 2024
Croatia	Contact Contactless			National identity card compulsory for Croatian citizens resident in Croatia aged 18 or over	First card free of charge (age <18); €13.27 (age 5-70); €9.29 (age >70); €25.88 for 10-day issue; €66.36 for 3-day issue	5 years; Note: Those aged over 70 may use their card past expiry indefinitely	The police on behalf of the Ministry of the Interior	2 August 2021
Cyprus	Contactless			National identity card compulsory for Cypriot citizens aged 12 or over	€30 (applicants aged 18 or over); €20 (children under 18)	10 years (age >18); 5 years (age <18)		12 August 2020
Czech Republic	Contact			National identity card compulsory for Czech citizens over 15 years of age with permanent residency in the Czech Republic	Free of charge for first issue or renewal of data; 200 CZK for all ID cards with an electronic chip for all reasons	10 years (age >15); 5 years (age <15)	Municipality on behalf of the Ministry of the Interior	2 August 2021
Denmark	—N/a	No national identity card. Danish identity cards are issued by municipalities without a common design and are not usable as travel documentation.		Identity documentation is optional (for Danish and Nordic citizens)	—N/a	—N/a	—N/a	—N/a
Estonia	Contact; Contactless			National identity card compulsory for all Estonian citizens aged 15 or over	€7 (age <15, retired or disabled, in Estonia); €10 (age <15, retired or disabled, abroad); €25 (age >15, in Estonia); €50 (age >15, abroad); €45 (urgent)	5 years	Police and Border Guard Board	23 August 2021
Finland	Contact			Identity documentation is optional	€49-55 (regular, for all citizens); €33-39 (children under 18, not valid as a travel document)	5 years	Police	13 March 2023
France	Contact Contactless			National identity card optional	Free of charge; €25 (if the previous one cannot be presented, e.g., it was lost or stolen)	10 years	City halls with a Dispositif de Recueil (on behalf of the prefecture)	15 March 2021
Germany	Contactless			National identity card optional; however, a national identity card or passport is compulsory for German citizens aged 16 or over.	€37.00 (applicants aged 24 or over); €22.80 (applicants aged under 24)	10 years (age >24); 6 years (age <24)	City or town of residence	2 May 2024
Greece	Contactless			National identity card compulsory for Greek citizens aged 12 or over	€10 for first issue and renewal (or reissue after reported stolen); €5 for members of large family households; + €9 for reissue if lost or destroyed	10 years	Police	25 September 2023
Hungary	Contactless			National identity card optional; however, a national identity card, passport or driving licence is compulsory for all Hungarian citizens	Free of charge	10 years (age >70); 6 years (age 18–70); 3 years (age <18)	Ministry of Interior	2 August 2021
Iceland	Contactless			Identity documentation is optional (for Icelandic and Nordic citizens)	9,200 ISK (18–66); 4,600 for children, elderly and disabled; 2x cost for urgent application.	10 years (age >18); 5 years (age <18)	Sheriff, on behalf of Registers Iceland	5 March 2024
(Republic of Ireland); Ireland	—N/a	No national identity card. Ireland issues an optional passport card, only if the applicant already has a valid passport booklet, or gets one in the same application.		Identity documentation is optional	—N/a	—N/a	—N/a	—N/a
Italy	Contactless			National identity card optional	In Italy: €16.79 + fees depending on municipality; Abroad: €21.95 or €27.11 (if previous card was lost or stolen)	It expires on the first birthday after: 3 years (age <3); 5 years (age 3–18); 9 years (age 18–70); Unlimited (age >70)	Municipality of residence on behalf of the Ministry of the Interior	29 September 2022
Latvia	Contact Contactless			National identity card compulsory for Latvian citizens aged 15 or over.	€25; €10 (age <20, retirees)	2 years (age <5); 5 years (age 5–20); 10 years (age >20)	Office of Citizenship and Migration Affairs	12 October 2021
Liechtenstein	Contactless			Identity documentation is optional	CHF65 (adults aged 18 or over); CHF30 (children under 18)	10 years (age >15); 3 years (age <15)	Immigration and Passport Office, Vaduz	3 January 2024
Lithuania	Contact Contactless			National identity card optional; however, a national identity card or passport is compulsory for Lithuanian citizens aged 16 or over.	€10 (adults); €5 (minors); €2 (persons of retirement age); €60 (urgent, 5 business days); €100 (urgent, 1 business day)	2 years (age <5); 5 years (age 5–16); 10 years (age 16–70); 30 years (age >70); 1 year (if fingerprints temporarily cannot be read)	Migration Department, Ministry of Internal Affairs	17 August 2021
Luxembourg	Contactless			National identity card compulsory for Luxembourgish citizens resident in Luxembourg aged 15 or over	€14 (people aged 15 or over); €10 (children aged 4–14); €5 (children under 4)	10 years (age >18); 5 years (age 4–14); 2 years (age <4)	Ministry of the Interior	2 August 2021
Malta	Contactless			National identity card compulsory for Maltese citizens aged 18 or over	Free of charge for first issue or renewal of data; €22 for renewal if lost, stolen or destroyed; €16.50 for renewal if defaced	10 years	Identità (Identity Malta)	28 September 2020
Netherlands	Contactless			National identity card optional; however, valid identity documentation is compulsory for all persons aged 14 or over.	€40.92 (age <18); €75.80 (age ≥18); €87.00 (age <18, abroad); €121.95 (age ≥18, abroad)	5 years (age <18); 10 years (age >18)	Municipality	2 August 2021
Norway	Contactless			Identity documentation is optional	NOK 840 (adults and children aged 10 or older); NOK 510 (children under 10)	5 years (age >10); 3 years (age 5–10); 2 years (age <5)	Norwegian Police Service	7 November 2024
Poland	Contactless			National identity card compulsory for Polish citizens resident in Poland aged 18 or over and optional for those under 18 and those residing abroad.	Free of charge	10 years (age >12); 5 years (age <12)	Municipality	8 November 2021
Portugal	Contact Contactless	Front	Back	National identity card (called "Citizen Card") compulsory for Portuguese citizens aged 20 days or over	Free of charge (age <1); €15 (age 1–25, in Portugal); €18 (age >25, in Portugal); €20 (age 1–25, abroad); €23 (age >25, abroad); €30 to €70 (expedited)	10 years (age >25); 5 years (age <25)	Institute of Registries and Notary	11 June 2024
Romania	Contact Contactless		Link to image	National identity card compulsory for Romanian citizens aged 14 or over with permanent residence in Romania	Free of charge (first e-ID card until August 29th 2026); 70 RON / ~13€ for e-ID, valid also as a travel document; 40 RON / ~8€ for the simple ID, not valid as a travel document	10 years (age ≥18); 5 years (age 14–18); 4 years (age 2–14); 2 years (age <2)	Ministry of Internal Affairs through the Directorate for Persons Record and Databases Management	20 March 2025
Slovakia	Contact Contactless		Link to image	National identity card compulsory for Slovak citizens aged 15 or over with permanent residence in Slovakia	Free of charge (first card at the age of 15, renewal after expiration, age >60, disabled); €14 (age <15: reissue of lost or stolen card, €7 if stolen during a robbery); €25 (age 15-59: reissue of lost or stolen card, free of change if stolen during a robbery); €7 (age <60: reissue for all other reasons); €20 extra fee for an expedited request	10 years (age >15); 5 years (age 6–15); 2 years (age <6)	Police	18 December 2024
Slovenia	Contact Contactless			National identity card optional; however, a form of ID with photo is compulsory for Slovenian citizens permanently resident in Slovenia aged 18 or over	€22.27 (age <3); €24.07 (age 3–12); €24.93 (age 12–18); €29.53 (age >18)	3 years (age <3); 5 years (age 3–18); 10 years (age >18)	Administrative unit	28 March 2022
Spain	Contact Contactless			National identity card compulsory for Spanish citizens residing in Spain aged 14 or over (not required for those residing abroad)	€12 (first issued, expired, lost or damaged); Free of charge (change of residency, "large family" status)	10 years (age >30); 5 years (age <30)	National Police Corps	2 August 2021
Sweden	Contactless			Identity documentation is optional	SEK 400	5 years (age >12); 3 years (age <12)	Swedish Police Authority	1 January 2022
Switzerland	No			Identity documentation is optional	CHF 70 (adults); CHF 35 (children)	10 years (age >18); 5 years (age <18)	Federal Office of Police through canton / municipality of residence	3 March 2023
Switzerland	Contactless			Identity documentation is optional	CHF 70 (adults); CHF 35 (children)	10 years (age >18); 5 years (age <18)	Federal Office of Police through canton / municipality of residence	2 November 2026

== See also ==
- Passports of the European Union
- European driving licence
- European Health Insurance Card
- Citizenship of the European Union
- Visa requirements for European Union citizens
- Schengen Area
- European Economic Area
- European Free Trade Association
- List of national identity card policies by country
- Identity document
- Internal passport
