= Nordic Passport Union =

Nordic ease-of-travel agreement

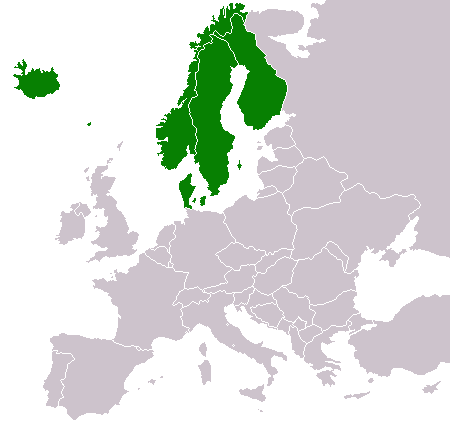
- Type: Free movement and open borders area
- Established: 1952 (open borders); 1954 (free movement)
- Members: Denmark and Faroe Islands (excluding Greenland); Finland; Iceland; Norway (excluding Svalbard); Sweden
- Area: 1,259,974 km^{2}
- Population: ~28 million (2024)

The Nordic Passport Union allows citizens of the Nordic countries—Iceland, Denmark, Norway, Sweden, and Finland—to travel and reside in another Nordic country without any travel documentation (e.g. a passport or national identity card) or a residence permit. Since 25 March 2001, all five states have also been in the Schengen Area.

The Faroe Islands are part of the Nordic Passport Union but not the Schengen Area, while Greenland and Svalbard are outside both. However, Greenland has an open border with all Nordic countries, and allows Nordic citizens to enter, settle and work without requiring a passport or permits. Svalbard allows Nordic citizens to settle and work without permits, as a result of the Svalbard Treaty; however, valid travel documentation (such as a passport, or a national identity card from a European Union or EFTA country) is required to enter Svalbard. Norwegian citizens were allowed to use other documents such as a Norwegian driving licence until 30 April 2022. As citizens of Nordic countries (Norway and Denmark, respectively), those from Svalbard and Greenland are permitted to reside in any other Nordic country.

In other parts of the world, public officials in the foreign services of any of the Nordic countries are to assist citizens of another Nordic country if that country is not represented in the territory concerned, according to the Helsinki Treaty.

== Establishment ==
The Nordic Passport Union was established in three stages. In 1952, Denmark, Norway, Sweden, and Finland agreed to abolish the requirement for passports for travel between them and to readmit citizens of other countries who had entered illegally into one of the four countries from another. On 1 July 1954, the agreement was extended to allow citizens to reside and work in any of the four countries without a residence or work permit. Iceland implemented the agreement on 1 January 1966. Passport checks for citizens of non-member countries at the borders between member countries were removed by a treaty between Denmark, Norway, Sweden, and Finland signed on 12 July 1957 and which came into force on 1 May 1958. The treaty was extended to Iceland on 24 September 1965 and to the Faroe Islands on 1 January 1966. Greenland and Svalbard remain outside the passport union.

== Nordic countries and Schengen ==
In December 1996 the two non-EU member states Norway and Iceland signed an association agreement with the signatories of the Schengen Agreement to become part of the Schengen Area. While this agreement never came into force, both countries did become part of the Schengen Area after concluding similar agreements with the EU. The Schengen Convention itself was not open for signature by non-EU member states.

From 25 March 2001, the Schengen acquis applied to the area of the Nordic Passport Union with the exception of the Faroe Islands. Border checkpoints have been removed within the Schengen Area, in addition to those that had been abolished previously within the Nordic Passport Union. In the case of the Faroe Islands, which are not part of the Schengen Area but remain part of the Nordic Area, the strict Schengen rules apply to travellers from the Faroe Islands into the Schengen Area, including the Nordic countries, but the Nordic rules allowing for an open border apply to those going the other way from the Nordic countries, but not necessarily from the other Schengen countries. However, citizens of the Nordic Passport Union countries enjoy extra rights within the Nordic area, not available under Schengen, such as less paperwork if moving to a different Nordic country, and fewer requirements for naturalization or citizenship. Within the Nordic area, any Nordic identity documentation (e.g. a driving licence) is valid as proof of identity for Nordic citizens because of the Nordic Passport Union, while a national identity card or a passport can be required in other Schengen countries. Most Scandinavian people do not own any Schengen approved national ID card, so they need a passport when visiting most Schengen countries outside the Nordic area, having in mind that most Schengen countries on the continent require possession of identity documentation by anyone, generally checked by hotels.

From March 2001, the Schengen rules have given more relaxed border checks from Denmark, including no passport checks at airports, since intra-Schengen travellers are separated from the travellers from outside the Schengen area. Still laws give police and guards the right to demand an identity document at airports.

== Agreements ==
=== Abolition of passport requirement for Nordic citizens ===
The protocol concerning the abolition of the requirement for passports to permit travel between Sweden, Denmark, Finland and Norway was signed on 14 July 1952, in Stockholm.

This protocol was implemented by the individual but concurrent decisions of the four governments. It abolished the need for citizens of the four countries to carry a passport when travelling in the three other countries provided that the trip was for such a short time that a residence permit was not necessary.

The agreement could be revoked in case of war, danger of war, or extraordinary international or national circumstances.

On 26 July 2014 the Norwegian police for the first time suspended this agreement due to a perceived terrorist threat.

=== Readmittance of aliens ===
The agreement for the readmittance of aliens, was signed on 14 July 1952, in Stockholm.

The agreement provides that any alien, i.e. persons not citizens of the Nordic countries, having illegally entered one of the Nordic countries directly from another Nordic country should be readmitted by that country, unless that person has stayed at least a year in that country or has received either a residence or work permit.

=== Exemption of passport or residence permit ===
The protocol concerning the exemption of nationals of Denmark, Finland, Norway and Sweden from the obligation to have a passport or residence permit while resident in a Nordic country other than their own, was signed on 22 May 1954 in Copenhagen.

The protocol was implemented by individual but concurrent decisions by the governments of each of the countries, and can be revoked in case of war, danger of war, or other extraordinary international or national circumstances.

The protocol provides that citizens of the Nordic countries can travel without passport or other travel documentation to any other Nordic country. Citizens of the Nordic countries can reside without residence permit in any other Nordic country.

Police authorities in the Nordic countries shall make all necessary information available to ascertain a person's identity and citizenship in a Nordic country.

=== Removal of passport checks at the internal Nordic borders ===
The agreement between Denmark, Finland, Norway and Sweden to remove passport control at the internal Nordic borders, was signed on 12 July 1957 in Copenhagen and came into force on 1 May 1958.

This agreement removed all passport checks at the internal Nordic borders, and required the Nordic countries to uphold passport control at the external borders. Aliens with residence permits are allowed to stay up to three months in other Nordic countries, except for seeking employment or conducting business.

Aliens who are denied entry into one Nordic country should also be denied entry into the other Nordic countries. The Nordic countries are also obliged to readmit aliens that should have been denied entry at the first point of entry.

== Temporary changes to border controls from 2015 ==
In November 2015, Sweden and Norway introduced temporary border controls, and requirements for all international airlines and ferries to check identity documents, due to the European migrant crisis. From 4 January 2016, Sweden required bus and train carriers to perform identity checks on the Danish side of the Denmark–Sweden border, while still retaining the border controls on the Swedish side. These controls were heavily criticised for violating the rules laid out in title III of the Schengen acquis prohibiting such carrier responsibility within the Schengen area, and were subsequently abolished by the Swedish government on 4 May 2017 to avoid potential formal sanctions. At the border, a traveller will need to be able to present a passport (and appropriate Schengen visa if required), an EU/EEA national ID card, or a Nordic driver's licence.

== See also ==
- 1950 Indo-Nepal Treaty of Peace and Friendship
- Benelux
- Central America-4 Border Control Agreement
- Common Travel Area
- Trans-Tasman Travel Arrangement
- Union State
- Citizenship of the Mercosur
