= Registers Iceland =

Official civil registry for Iceland

- Þjóðskrá Íslands
- Logo of Registers Iceland

Agency overview
- Formed: 1 July 2010
- Jurisdiction: Iceland
- Headquarters: Reykjavík, Iceland
- Minister responsible: Þorbjörg Sigríður Gunnlaugsdóttir, Minister of Justice
- Agency executive: Hildur Ragnars, Director
- Website: www.skra.is

Registers Iceland (Icelandic: Þjóðskrá Íslands) is the main official civil registry for the nation of Iceland. It was formed in 2010 with the merger of Þjóðskrá and Fasteignaskrá Íslands.
