= Visa requirements for EFTA nationals =

Administrative entry restrictions

- Logo

- Location of the EFTA (green) in Europe (green & dark grey)
- Member states: Iceland; Liechtenstein; Norway; Switzerland
- Website efta.int

Visa requirements for EFTA nationals are administrative entry restrictions by the authorities of other states placed on citizens of the European Free Trade Association (EFTA) member states.

Current member states of EFTA are Iceland, Liechtenstein, Norway and Switzerland.

Member states' citizens enjoy freedom of movement in each other's territories in accordance with the EFTA convention. EFTA nationals also enjoy freedom of movement in the European Union (EU). EFTA nationals and EU citizens and are not only visa-exempt but are legally entitled to enter and reside in each other's countries. The Citizens’ Rights Directive (also sometimes called the "Free Movement Directive") defines the right of free movement for citizens of the European Economic Area (EEA), which includes the three EFTA members Iceland, Norway and Liechtenstein and the member states of the EU. Switzerland, which is a member of EFTA but not of the EEA, is not bound by the Directive but rather has a separate bilateral agreement on free movement with the EU.

== Visa requirements maps ==
Visa requirements for Icelandic citizens

Visa requirements for Liechtenstein citizens

Visa requirements for Norwegian citizens

Visa requirements for Swiss citizens

== Visa free access ==
This table lists all countries, as of this date with source information as it is cited inline, for which citizens of at least one EFTA member state may enter without a visa on an ordinary passport. Information regarding visas on arrival and on exit fees is not listed in the table, regarding which, see the relevant section below.

Africa
Country	Visa not required	Visa required	Notes
Botswana	All states.		90 days within 12 months.
Cape Verde	All states.		30 days.
Eswatini	Norway, Switzerland.	Iceland, Liechtenstein	30 days.
Gambia	All states.		90 days.
Lesotho	All others.	Liechtenstein	14 days.
Mauritius	All states.		90 days.
Morocco	All states.		90 days.
Namibia	All states.		3 months within a calendar year.
Senegal	All states.		90 days.
Seychelles	All states.		3 months.
South Africa	All states.		90 days.
Tunisia	All states.		3 months
Caribbean
Country	Visa not required	Visa required	Notes
Antigua and Barbuda	All states.		3 months.
Bahamas	All states.		3 months.
Barbados	All states.		3 months.
Dominica	All states.		21 days (90 days for Norway).
Dominican Republic	All states.		90 days (30-day tourist cards required).
Grenada	All states.		3 months.
Haiti	All states.		3 months.
Jamaica	All states.		90 days
Saint Kitts and Nevis	All states.		3 months.
Saint Lucia	All states.		6 weeks.
Saint Vincent and the Grenadines	All states.		1 month.
Trinidad and Tobago	All states.		90 days within any 180 day period.
Central and North America
Country	Visa not required	Visa required	Notes
Belize	All states.		1 month for Switzerland.
Canada	All states.		6 months, eTA required if arriving by air.
Costa Rica	All states.		90 days.
El Salvador	All states.		90 days.
Guatemala	All states.		90 days.
Honduras	All states.		90 days.
Mexico	All states.		180 days.
Nicaragua	All states.		90 days (30-day tourist cards required).
Panama	All states.		180 days.
United States	All states (VWP)		90 days on every arrival from overseas, ESTA (issued for 2 years) required when arriving by air and cruise ship.
South America
Country	Visa not required	Visa required	Notes
Argentina	All states.		90 days.
Bolivia	All states.		90 days.
Brazil	All states.		90 days.
Chile	All states.		90 days.
Colombia	All states.		90 days - extendable up to 180-days stay within a one-year period.
Ecuador	All states.		90 days.
Guyana	Norway, Switzerland.	Iceland, Liechtenstein	3 months.
Paraguay	All states.		90 days.
Peru	All states.		90 days.
Uruguay	All states.		90 days, extendable once.
Venezuela	All states.		90 days, extendable once.
Asia
Country	Visa not required	Visa required	Notes
Brunei	All states.		90 days.
China	All states. (Note: Temporarily until 31 December 2025.)	All others. Except short term visits in transit and Hainan.	30 days. Temporarily until 31 December 2025.
Indonesia	All states.		30 days.
Japan	All states.		90 days.
Kazakhstan	All others.	Liechtenstein	30 days.
Kyrgyzstan	All states		60 days.
Laos	Switzerland	All others.	15 days.
Malaysia	All states.		90 days.
Philippines	All states.		30 days.
South Korea	All states.		90 days.
Singapore	All states.		90 days (30 days for Iceland and Liechtenstein).
Thailand	All states.		30 days, extendable once.
Timor-Leste	All states		90 days.
United Arab Emirates	All states.		90 days.
Uzbekistan	All states.		30 days.
Vietnam	Norway.	All others.	15 days.
Middle East and Caucasus
Country	Visa not required	Visa required	Notes
Armenia	All states.		180 days.
Georgia	All states.		1 year.
Israel	All states.		3 months.
Europe
Country	Visa not required	Visa required	Notes
Albania	All states.		90 days.
Andorra	All states.		
Belarus	All states.		5 days. Must enter through the Minsk National Airport.
Bosnia and Herzegovina	All states.		90 days within 180 days.
European Union: Austria; Belgium; Bulgaria; Croatia; Cyprus; Czech Republic; Denmark; Estonia; Finland; France; Germany; Greece; Hungary; Ireland; Italy; Latvia; Lithuania; Luxembourg; Malta; Netherlands; Poland; Portugal; Romania; Slovakia; Slovenia; Spain; Sweden	All states.		Freedom of movement.
Moldova	All states.		90 days within 180 days.
Montenegro	All states.		90 days within 180 days.
North Macedonia	All states.		90 days within 180 days.
Monaco	All states.		
San Marino	All states.		
Serbia	All states.		90 days within 180 days.
Turkey	All states.		90 days within 180 days.
Ukraine	All states.		90 days within 180 days.
United Kingdom of Great Britain and Northern Ireland	All states (ETA).		6 months. ETA (issued for 2 years) required, unless holding rights under the EU Settlement Scheme.
Vatican City	All states.		
Oceania
Country	Visa not required	Visa required	Notes
Australia	All states (eVisitor).		90 days on each visit in 12-month period if granted.
Fiji	All states.		4 months.
Kiribati	All states.		90 days.
Micronesia	All states.		90 days within 180 days.
New Zealand	All states.		90 days.
Palau	All states.		90 days.
Samoa	All states.		90 days within any 180 day period.
Solomon Islands	All states.		90 days.
Tonga	All states		90 days.
Tuvalu	All states.		90 days.
Vanuatu	All others.	Iceland	90 days.

All EFTA nationals can visit the following partially recognised countries or territories with autonomous immigration policies without a visa:

Asia

- Hong Kong
- Macau
- Palestine
- Taiwan

Europe

- Kosovo
- Northern Cyprus
- South Ossetia
- Transnistria

=== Reciprocity ===
Schengen Area Countries with open borders Legally obliged to join

The EFTA member states are all part of the Schengen Area, an area comprising 29 European states that have eliminated border controls with other Schengen members and strengthened border controls with non-Schengen countries. The Schengen area mostly functions as a single country for international travel purposes, with a common visa policy. Since 2001, the European Union has issued two lists regarding visas for the Schengen Area: a white list of countries whose nationals do not require visas (Annex II) and a black list of countries whose nationals do require visas (Annex I). As per Regulation No 539/2001 (amended by Regulation No 1289/2013) reciprocity is required from all Annex II countries and territories. That means that these countries must offer visa-free access for 90 days to citizens of the 29 Schengen member states.

When this is not the case, the affected Schengen member state is expected to notify the European Commission. Starting six months after the notification, the Commission may adopt an implementing act to suspend the visa-free regime for certain categories of nationals of the third country concerned, for a period of up to six months, with a possible prolongation by further periods of up to six months. If the Commission decides not to adopt such an act, it has to present a report explaining the reasons why it did not propose the measure. If after two years from the notification the third country is still requiring visas from citizens of one or more Member States, the Commission shall adopt a delegated act to re-impose the visa obligation on all citizens of the third country, for a period of 12 months. Either the European Parliament or the Council could oppose the entry into force of the delegated acts. All of the states that implement the common visa rules – including Iceland, Liechtenstein, Norway, Switzerland, Bulgaria, Croatia, Cyprus and Romania – may notify the European Commission about non-compliant third states.

According to a report from April 2015, the Commission dismissed notifications by both Bulgaria and Romania of a general visa requirement by Australia. It concluded that the Australian electronic visa 'manual processing' treatment should not be considered as equivalent to the Schengen visa application procedures and consequently will not be covered by the reciprocity mechanism. In its previous report, the Commission also committed to assessing certain provisions of the US electronic visa system — such as the application fee. In its previous report, the Commission also committed to assessing certain provisions of the US ESTA system — such as the application fee — and the Australian eVisitor system.

==== Special requirements ====
The following countries require electronic registrations for all EFTA nationals:

- Australia requires EFTA nationals to obtain an eVisitor, which is issued free of charge.
- Canada requires EFTA nationals to obtain an eTA. The application fee is 7 CAD.
- New Zealand requires EFTA nationals to obtain an NZeTA and IVL if arriving by air. The application fee is NZD 9 or 12 and NZD 35.
- United Kingdom requires EFTA nationals to obtain an ETA. The application fee is 16 GBP.
- United States requires EFTA nationals to obtain an ESTA. The application fee is 21 USD.
Visa policy of the Schengen Area

== Visa on arrival ==
The following countries provide visa on arrival to EFTA nationals. Some countries may not provide visa on arrival facilities at all entry points.

Visa on arrival for citizens of all EFTA states	Notes
Bahrain	14 days. BD 25.
Bangladesh	30 days. Fees vary per country. Extensions are possible.
Burkina Faso	1 month, extension possible. XOF 47,000 to XOF 61,000.
Cambodia	30 days. USD 20.
Cape Verde	EUR 25.
Comoros	50 USD. EUR 30.
Djibouti	1 month. EUR 75.
Egypt	30 days. USD 25.
Guinea Bissau	90 days. EUR 85.
Indonesia	30 days. USD 35.
Iran	30 days. EUR 30–80.
Jordan	30 days. Free of charge.
Kenya	3 months, extendable once. USD 50.
Kuwait	3 months. KWD 3.
Laos	30 days. USD 30.
Lebanon	1 month extendable for 2 additional months.
Madagascar	30 days. Free of charge.
Malawi	30 days. Extendable up to 90 days. Fees vary.
Maldives	30 days. Free of charge. Extendable up to 90 days, MVR 750.
Mauritania	
Mozambique	30 days, extendable up to 60 days.
Nepal	90 days. USD 25-100.
Oman	3 months. OMR 5-20.
Papua New Guinea	60 days. Free of charge.
Philippines	59 days. USD 50.
Qatar	1 month. QAR 50-150.
Sri Lanka	30 days, extendable up to 150 days. Fees vary.
Suriname	90 days. USD 20.
Tanzania	USD 50 - USD 100.
Togo	7 days, extendable for 90 days. XOF 10,000-90,000.
Uganda	USD 100.
Zambia	90 days. USD 50 - USD 80.
Zimbabwe	3 months. USD 30 - USD 70.

Visa on arrival available to the citizens of some EFTA countries. Some countries may not provide visa on arrival facilities at all entry points.
Country	Visa on arrival available to citizens of	Notes
Ethiopia	Norway, Switzerland	USD 20.
Marshall Islands	Iceland, Norway, Switzerland	USD 100

== Limited visa on arrival ==
- Burundi - Visas are issued on arrival if an Entry Authorisation letter was issued by the authorities of Burundi.
- Iraq – Holders of ordinary passports of all EFTA member states except Switzerland may obtain a visa on arrival for Iraqi Kurdistan valid for 15 days when arriving through the Erbil International Airport or Sulaimaniyah International Airport.
- Pakistan - Nationals from Norway and Switzerland may obtain visa on arrival when travelling on business. They must have a local sponsor who must obtain an approval from the immigration authorities at the port of arrival (Islamabad, Lahore, Peshawar, Quetta or Karachi airports) and a recommendation letter from country of residence or invitation letter from Pakistan. Nationals of Iceland and Norway may obtain a visa on arrival for a maximum stay of 30 days, if they are travelling as part of a group through a designated tour operator.
- Somalia - Visas are issued on arrival for 30 days (extendable once) provided an invitation letter issued by the sponsor has been submitted to the Airport Immigration Department at least 2 days before arrival.
- Vietnam - Visitors can obtain a visa on arrival for a maximum stay of 1 or 3 months if they are holders of an approval letter issued and stamped by the Vietnamese Immigration Department (obtainable online through travel agencies for a fee) and if arriving only at airports in Hanoi, Ho Chi Minh City or Da Nang. All travellers can visit Phú Quốc without a visa for up to 30 days.

== Online visas ==
The following countries provide electronic visas to EFTA nationals.

Electronic visas available to citizens of the EFTA states	Notes
Azerbaijan	Available to all EFTA nationals.
Bahrain	Available to all EFTA nationals.Visa on arrival also available.
Cambodia	Available to all EFTA nationals. Visa on arrival also available.
Gabon	Available to all EFTA nationals.
India	Available to all EFTA nationals.
Ivory Coast	Available to all EFTA nationals.
Kenya	Available to all EFTA nationals. Visa on arrival also available.
Kuwait	Available to all EFTA nationals. Visa on arrival also available.
Malawi	Available to all EFTA nationals. Visa on arrival also available.
Myanmar	Available to citizens of Iceland, Norway and Switzerland.
Nepal	Available to all EFTA nationals. Visa on arrival also available.
Oman	Available to all EFTA nationals. Visa on arrival also available.
Russia	Available to all EFTA nationals.
Rwanda	Available to all EFTA nationals.
São Tomé and Príncipe	Available to all EFTA nationals.
Sri Lanka	Available to all EFTA nationals. Visa on arrival also available.
Tajikistan	Available to all EFTA nationals. Visa on arrival also available.
Uganda	Available to all EFTA nationals. Visa on arrival also available.
Vietnam	Available to the citizens of Norway. However, Norwegian citizens do not require a visa for visits up to 15 days.
Zambia	Available to all EFTA nationals. Visa on arrival also available.
Zimbabwe	Available to all EFTA nationals. Visa on arrival also available.

== Prearranged visa required ==
All EFTA citizens must always arrange the visa prior to travel to (as of March 2017) the following countries.

Prearranged visa required for citizens of all EFTA states	Notes
Afghanistan	
Algeria	
Angola	
Benin	
Bhutan	
Cameroon	
Central African Republic	
Chad	
Republic of the Congo	
Democratic Republic of the Congo	
Cuba	Can be obtained in travel agencies or airlines.
Equatorial Guinea	
Eritrea	
Ghana	
Guinea	
Iraq	Outside Iraqi Kurdistan
Ivory Coast	
North Korea	
Liberia	
Libya	
Mali	
Mongolia	
Nauru	
Niger	
Nigeria	
Russia	15 days visa-free within the territory covered by the agreement for holders of a border traffic permit. (Eligible inhabitants of the border regions in Norway and Russia).
Saudi Arabia	
Sierra Leone	
South Sudan	
Sudan	
Syria	
Turkmenistan	
Uzbekistan	
Yemen	

== Other ==
- China – All EFTA nationals are afforded 24-hour visa-free transit. Further, citizens of Iceland and Norway (and Switzerland – however, Swiss citizens are also afforded 15 days visa free visits) transiting through People's Republic of China at one of 31 ports may leave the terminal and visit the city for up to 72 hours, these ports include– Beijing, Chengdu, Guangzhou and Shanghai. Visa-free access to Hainan Island as long as the visit lasts 15 days or less and is part of a tour group organised by a National Tourism Administration of China-approved travel agency based in Hainan is granted to the following EFTA nationals - Iceland, Norway and Switzerland.
- Nauru – Simplified visa procedure for citizens of Iceland and Norway. Unlike other visitors, they do not have to submit a criminal record certificate and a certificate of medical fitness together with visa application.
- Russia - all EFTA nationals are eligible for eVisa access to Kaliningrad Oblast for up to 8 days.
- Uzbekistan – Simplified visa procedure that waives invitation letter requirement is in force for the citizens of Switzerland.
- Zambia / Zimbabwe - a universal KAZA visa that is valid for both countries can be issued on arrival to citizens of all EFTA member states.
- Kenya / Rwanda / Uganda - an East Africa Borderless Visa: Travelers from any country can obtain a multiple entry visa that allows entry to these three countries for tourism over period of 90 days. Visa must be first used in the country that issued it.

== Non-ordinary passports ==
In addition to visa requirements for normal passport holders certain countries have specific visa requirements towards diplomatic and various official passport holders:

Visa-free access for holders of various categories of official passports
Country	Visa-free access
Iceland	Russia (diplomatic passports)
Liechtenstein	Russia (diplomatic passports), Thailand (diplomatic or official passports),
Norway	Azerbaijan (diplomatic passports), India (diplomatic passports), Kazakhstan (diplomatic passports), Mexico (diplomatic, official or service passports), Pakistan (diplomatic passports), Philippines (diplomatic, official or service passports), Russia (diplomatic passports), Turkey (diplomatic passports)
Switzerland	Algeria (diplomatic or official passports), Angola (diplomatic passports), China (diplomatic passports), Cuba (diplomatic passports), India (diplomatic passports), Indonesia (diplomatic or service passports), Iran (diplomatic passports), Kazakhstan (diplomatic passports), Kuwait (diplomatic or official passports), Qatar (diplomatic or official passports), Russia (diplomatic passports), Thailand (diplomatic or official passports), Vietnam (diplomatic passports)

Cape Verde, Ethiopia, Mali and Zimbabwe grant visa-free access to holders of diplomatic or service passports issued to nationals of any country. Mauritania and Senegal grant visa-free access to holders of diplomatic passports issued to nationals of any country (except Italy for Mauritania). Bahrain, Bangladesh, Burkina Faso, Cambodia and South Sudan allow holders of diplomatic, official, service and special passports issued to nationals of any country to obtain a visa on arrival.

== Non-visa restrictions ==
=== Blank passport pages ===
Many countries require a minimum number of blank pages to be available in the passport being presented, typically one or two pages. Endorsement pages, which often appear after the visa pages, are not counted as being valid or available.

=== Vaccination ===
Cover of the new International Certificate of Vaccination issued by the Bureau of Quarantine in the Philippines since 2021

The African countries of Angola, Benin, Burkina Faso, Burundi, Cameroon, Central African Republic, Democratic Republic of the Congo, Republic of the Congo, Côte d'Ivoire, Gabon, Ghana, Guinea-Bissau, Mali, Niger, Sierra Leone and Togo, South Sudan and Uganda, along with French Guiana in South America, require all incoming passengers older than nine months to one year, to have a current International Certificate of Vaccination or Prophylaxis.

Some other countries require vaccination only if the passenger is coming from an infected area or has visited one recently or has transited for 12 hours in those countries: Algeria, Botswana, Cabo Verde, Chad, Djibouti, Egypt, Eswatini, Ethiopia, Gambia, Ghana, Guinea, Lesotho, Libya, Equatorial Guinea, Eritrea, Madagascar, Malawi, Mauritania, Mauritius, Mozambique, Namibia, Nigeria, Papua New Guinea, Seychelles, Somalia, South Africa, Sudan, Tunisia, Uganda, Tanzania, Zambia and Zimbabwe.

=== Passport validity length ===
Very few countries, such as Paraguay, just require a valid passport on arrival.

However many countries and groupings now require only an identity card – especially from their neighbours. Other countries may have special bilateral arrangements that depart from the generality of their passport validity length policies to shorten the period of passport validity required for each other's citizens or even accept passports that have already expired (but not been cancelled).

Some countries, such as Japan, Ireland and the United Kingdom, require a passport valid throughout the period of the intended stay.

In the absence of specific bilateral agreements, countries requiring passports to be valid for at least 6 more months on arrival include Afghanistan, Algeria, Anguilla, Bahrain, Bhutan, Botswana, British Virgin Islands, Brunei, Cambodia, Cameroon, Cape Verde, Cayman Islands, Central African Republic, Chad, Comoros, Costa Rica, Côte d'Ivoire, Curaçao, Ecuador, Egypt, El Salvador, Equatorial Guinea, Fiji, Gabon, Guinea Bissau, Guyana, Haiti, India, Indonesia, Iran, Iraq, Israel, Jordan, Kenya, Kiribati, Kuwait, Laos, Madagascar, Malaysia, Marshall Islands, Mongolia, Myanmar, Namibia, Nepal, Nicaragua, Nigeria, Oman, Palau, Papua New Guinea, Peru, Philippines, Qatar, Rwanda, Samoa, Saudi Arabia, Singapore, Solomon Islands, Somalia, Sri Lanka, Sudan, Suriname, Tanzania, Thailand, Timor-Leste, Tokelau, Tonga, Turkey, Tuvalu, Uganda, United Arab Emirates, Vanuatu, Venezuela, and Vietnam.

Countries requiring passports valid for at least 4 months on arrival include Micronesia and Zambia.

Countries requiring passports with a validity of at least 3 months beyond the date of intended departure include Azerbaijan, Bosnia and Herzegovina, Honduras, Montenegro, Nauru, Moldova and New Zealand. Similarly, the EEA countries of Iceland, Liechtenstein, Norway, all European Union countries (except Ireland) together with Switzerland also require 3 months validity beyond the date of the bearer's intended departure unless the bearer is an EEA or Swiss national.

Countries requiring passports valid for at least 3 months on arrival include Albania, North Macedonia, Panama, and Senegal.

Bermuda requires passports to be valid for at least 45 days upon entry.

Countries that require a passport validity of at least one month beyond the date of intended departure include Eritrea, Hong Kong, Lebanon, Macau, the Maldives and South Africa.

==== Maximum passport age ====
Countries of the Schengen area require non-EU passports to be less than 10 years old upon entry.

=== Criminal record ===
Some countries, including Australia, Canada, Fiji, New Zealand and the United States, routinely deny entry to non-citizens who have a criminal record, while others impose restrictions depending on the type of conviction and the length of the sentence.

=== Persona non grata ===
The government of a country can declare a diplomat persona non grata, banning them from entering the country or expelling them if they have already entered. In non-diplomatic use, the authorities of a country may also declare a foreigner persona non grata permanently or temporarily, usually because of unlawful activity.

=== Israeli stamps ===
Kuwait, Lebanon, Libya, and Yemen do not allow entry to people with passport stamps from Israel or whose passports have either a used or an unused Israeli visa, or where there is evidence of previous travel to Israel such as entry or exit stamps from neighbouring border posts in transit countries such as Jordan and Egypt.

To circumvent this Arab League boycott of Israel, the Israeli immigration services have now mostly ceased to stamp foreign nationals' passports on either entry to or exit from Israel (unless the entry is for some work-related purposes). Since 15 January 2013, Israel no longer stamps foreign passports at Ben Gurion Airport. Passports are still (as of 22 June 2017) stamped at Erez when passing into and out of Gaza.

Iran refuses admission to holders of passports containing an Israeli visa or stamp that is less than 12 months old.

=== Biometrics ===
Several countries mandate that all travellers, or all foreign travellers, be fingerprinted on arrival and will refuse admission to or even arrest travellers who refuse to comply. In some countries, such as the United States, this may apply even to transit passengers who merely wish to change planes rather than go landside.

Fingerprinting countries/regions include Afghanistan, Argentina, Brunei, Cambodia, China, Ethiopia, Ghana, Guinea, India, Japan, Kenya (both fingerprints and a photo are taken), Malaysia upon entry and departure, Mongolia, Saudi Arabia, the Schengen Area, Singapore, South Korea, Taiwan, Thailand, Uganda, the United Arab Emirates and the United States.

Many countries also require a photo be taken of people entering the country. The United States, which does not fully implement exit control formalities at its land frontiers (although long mandated by its own legislation), intends to implement facial recognition for passengers departing from international airports to identify people who overstay their visa.

Together with fingerprint and face recognition, iris scanning is one of three biometric identification technologies internationally standardised since 2006 by the International Civil Aviation Organization (ICAO) for use in e-passports and the United Arab Emirates conducts iris scanning on visitors who need to apply for a visa. The United States Department of Homeland Security has announced plans to greatly increase the biometric data it collects at US borders. In 2018, Singapore began trials of iris scanning at three land and maritime immigration checkpoints.

== Passport rankings ==
Passport rankings by the number of countries and territories their holders could visit without a visa or by obtaining visa on arrival as of 5 October 2021 were as follows: Swiss — 186 countries and territories (ranked 6th) Norwegian — 185 (7th); Icelandic — 180 (12th), and Liechtenstein — 178 (14th), according to the Henley Passport Index.

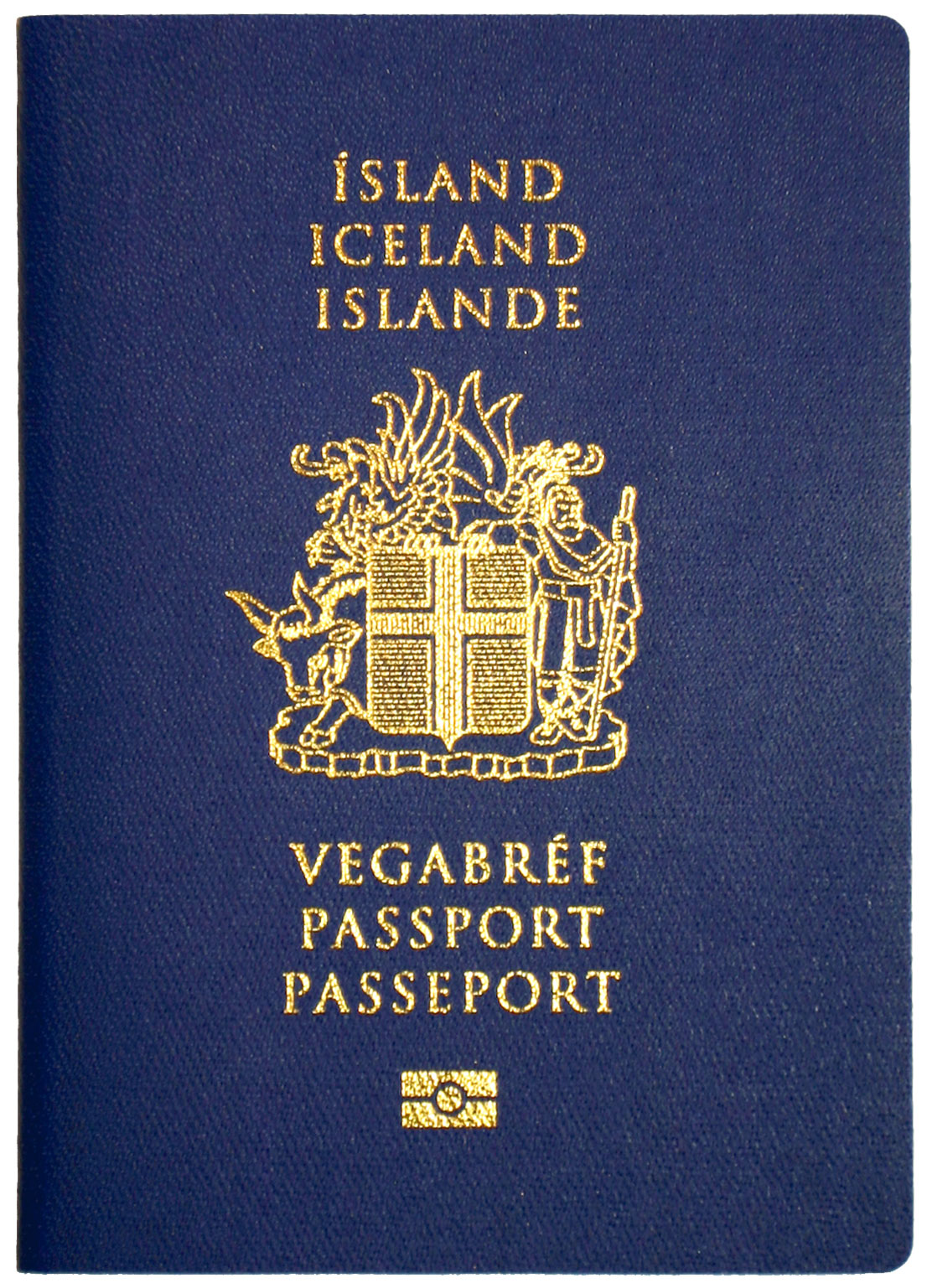
Icelandic passport

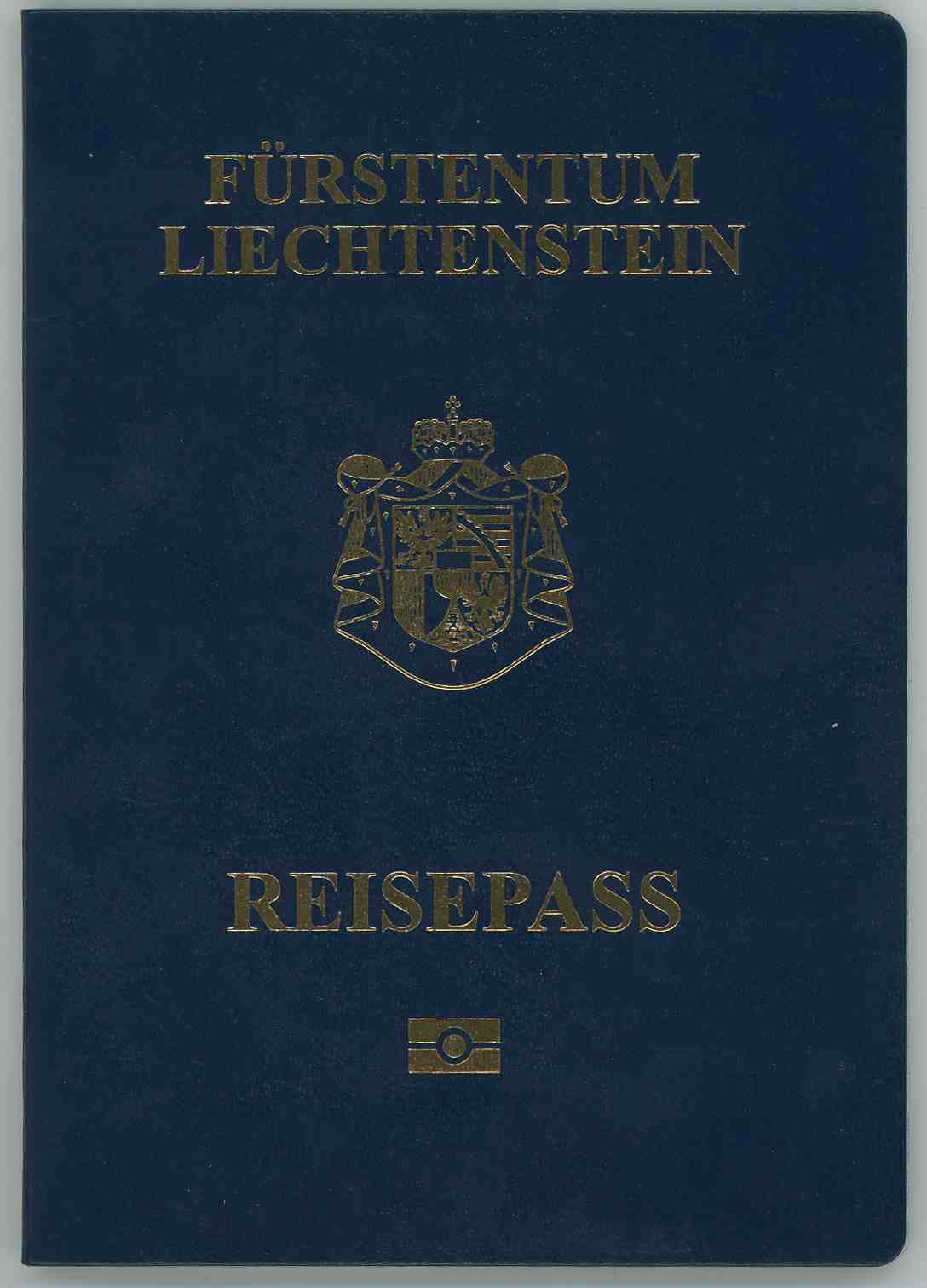
Liechtenstein passport

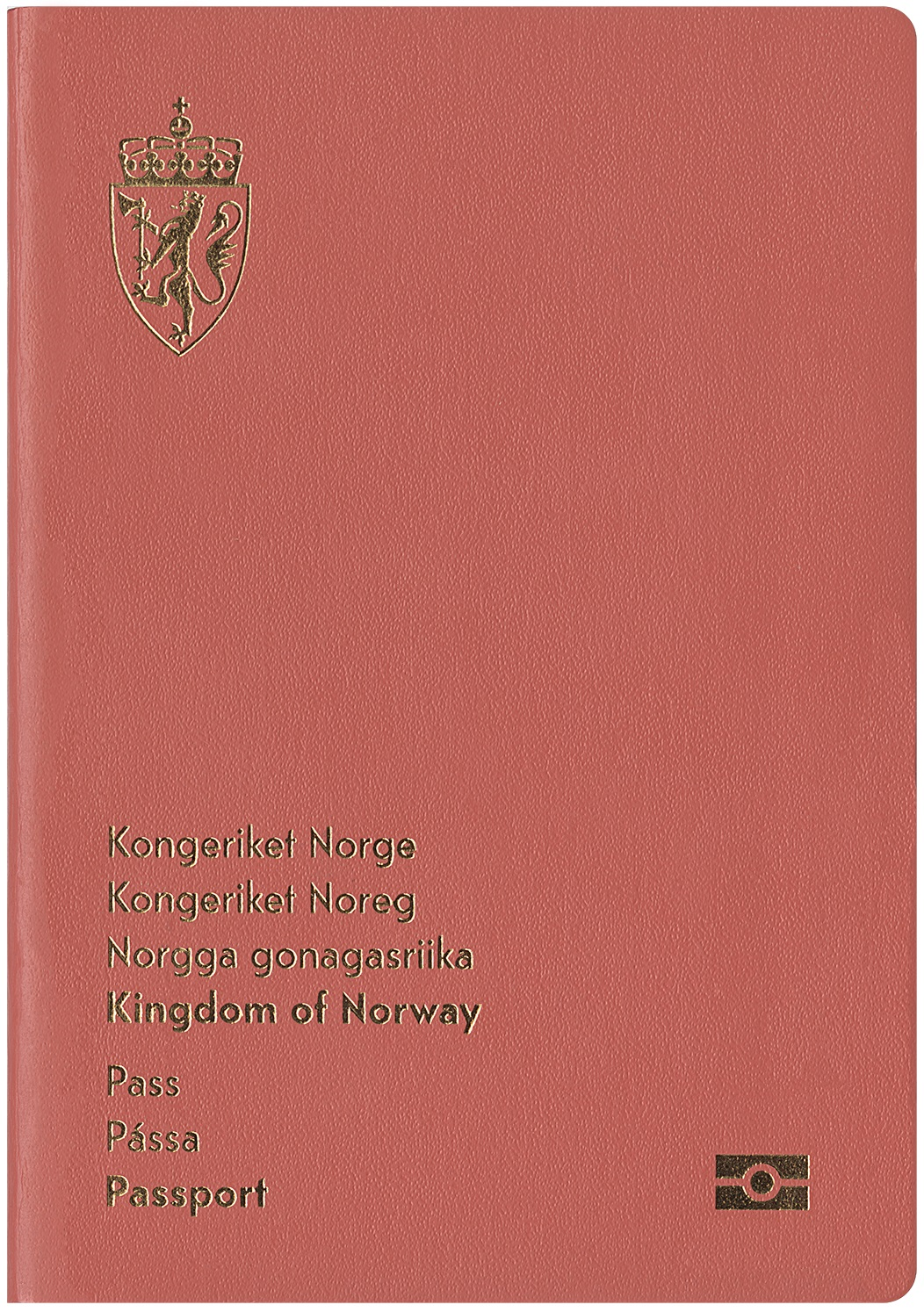
Norwegian passport

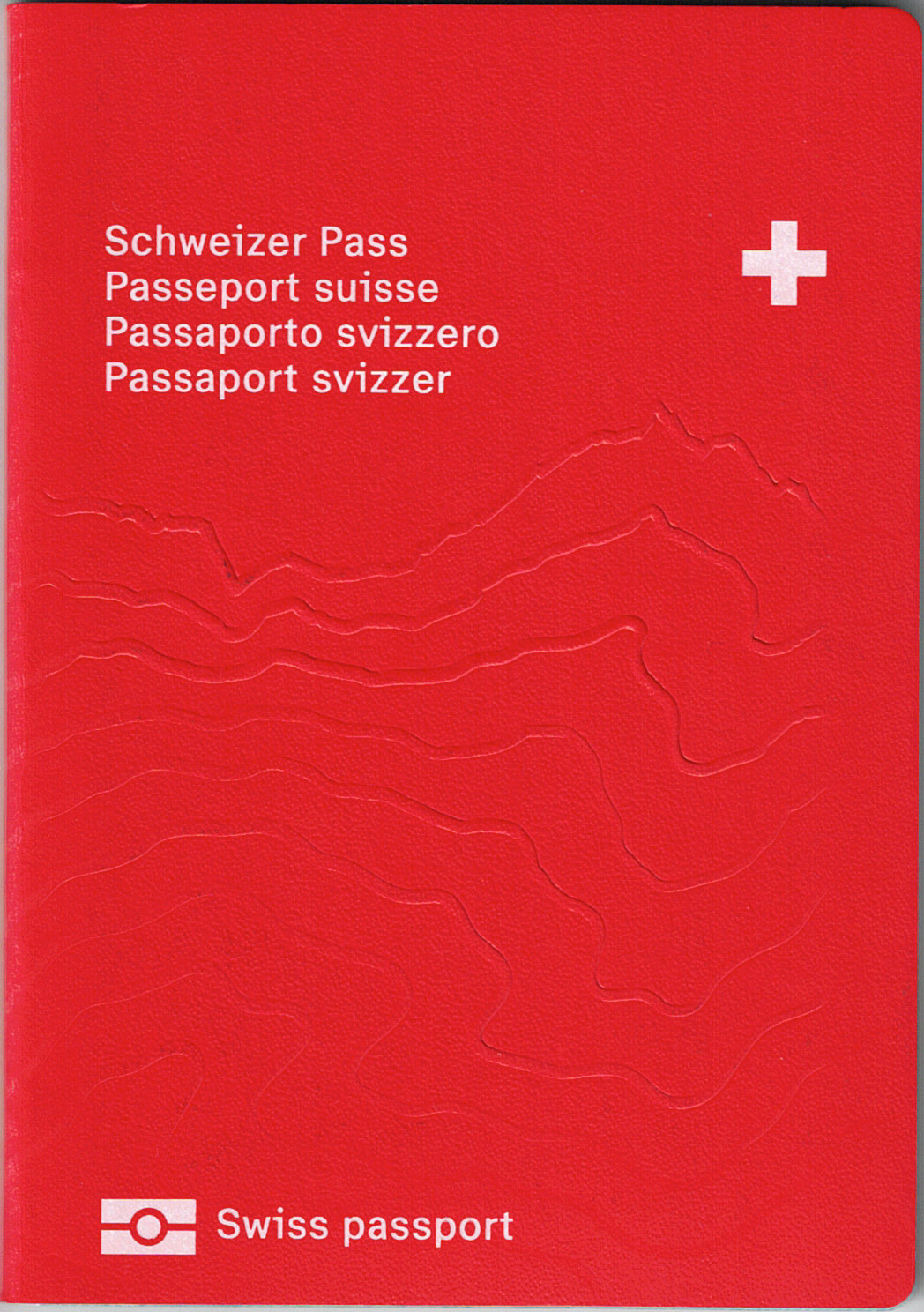
Swiss passport

== Freedom of movement within EFTA and the EEA ==
Members of the EU (blue) and EFTA (green)

EFTA member states' citizens enjoy freedom of movement in each other's territories in accordance with the EFTA convention. EFTA nationals also enjoy freedom of movement in the European Union (EU). EFTA nationals and EU citizens and are not only visa-exempt but are legally entitled to enter and reside in each other's countries. The Citizens’ Rights Directive (also sometimes called the "Free Movement Directive") defines the right of free movement for citizens of the European Economic Area (EEA), which includes the three EFTA members Iceland, Norway and Liechtenstein and the member states of the EU. Switzerland, which is a member of EFTA but not of the EEA, is not bound by the Directive but rather has a separate bilateral agreement on free movement with the EU.

As a result, de facto, a citizen of an EFTA country can live and work in all the other EFTA countries and in all the EU countries, and a citizen of an EU country can live and work in all the EFTA countries (but for voting and working in sensitive fields, such as government / police / military, citizenship is often required, and non-citizens may not have the same rights to welfare and unemployment benefits as citizens).

As an alternative to holding a passport, a valid national identity card can also be used to exercise the right of free movement within EFTA and the EU/EEA Travellers should still bring a passport or national identity card, as one may be required. Strictly speaking, it is not necessary for an EEA or Swiss citizen to possess a valid passport or national identity card to enter the EEA or Switzerland. In theory, if an EEA or Swiss citizen outside of both the EEA and Switzerland can prove his/her nationality by any other means (e.g. by presenting an expired passport or national identity card, or a citizenship certificate), he/she must be permitted to enter the EEA or Switzerland. An EEA or Swiss citizen who is unable to demonstrate his/her nationality satisfactorily must nonetheless be given 'every reasonable opportunity' to obtain the necessary documents or to have them delivered within a reasonable period of time or corroborate or prove by other means that he/she is covered by the right of free movement.

However, EEA member states and Switzerland can refuse entry to an EEA/Swiss national on public policy, public security or public health grounds where the person presents a "genuine, present and sufficiently serious threat affecting one of the fundamental interests of society". If the person has obtained permanent residence in the country where he/she seeks entry (a status which is normally attained after 5 years of residence), the member state can only expel him/her on serious grounds of public policy or public security. Where the person has resided for 10 years or is a minor, the member state can only expel him/her on imperative grounds of public security (and, in the case of minors, if expulsion is necessary in the best interests of the child, as provided for in the Convention on the Rights of the Child). Expulsion on public health grounds must relate to diseases with 'epidemic potential' which have occurred less than 3 months from the person's the date of arrival in the Member State where he/she seeks entry.

A family member of an EEA/Swiss citizen who is in possession of a residence permit indicating their status is exempt from the requirement to hold a visa when entering the European Economic Area or Switzerland when they are accompanying their EEA/Swiss family member or are seeking to join them. However the UK requires family members to obtain a special permit in order to enter the United Kingdom. Non-EEA family members will need a Schengen Visa before they travel to Switzerland even if they possess a UK residence permit that clearly mentions that they are the family member of an EEA citizen.

== Consular protection of EFTA nationals abroad ==
When in a foreign country, Norwegian and Icelandic citizens can seek help from the mission of any of the Nordic countries if their own country does not have a diplomatic mission in the country they are visiting. This is according to the Helsinki Treaty, which state that public officials in the foreign services of any of the Nordic countries are to assist citizens of another Nordic country if that country is not represented in the territory concerned.

The Principality of Liechtenstein maintains a very small network of diplomatic missions. Switzerland is representing Liechtenstein in those countries wherein Liechtenstein itself does not maintain consular representation.

== See also ==
- Passports of the EFTA member states
- Visa policy of the Schengen Area
- Visa requirements for Icelandic citizens
- Visa requirements for Liechtenstein citizens
- Visa requirements for Norwegian citizens
- Visa requirements for Swiss citizens
