= Passports of the European Economic Area =

Passports of the European Economic Area may refer to:

- Passports of the EFTA member states
- Passports of the European Union
