= Liechtenstein passport =

Passport of the Principality of Liechtenstein

Liechtenstein passport Liechtensteiner Reisepass
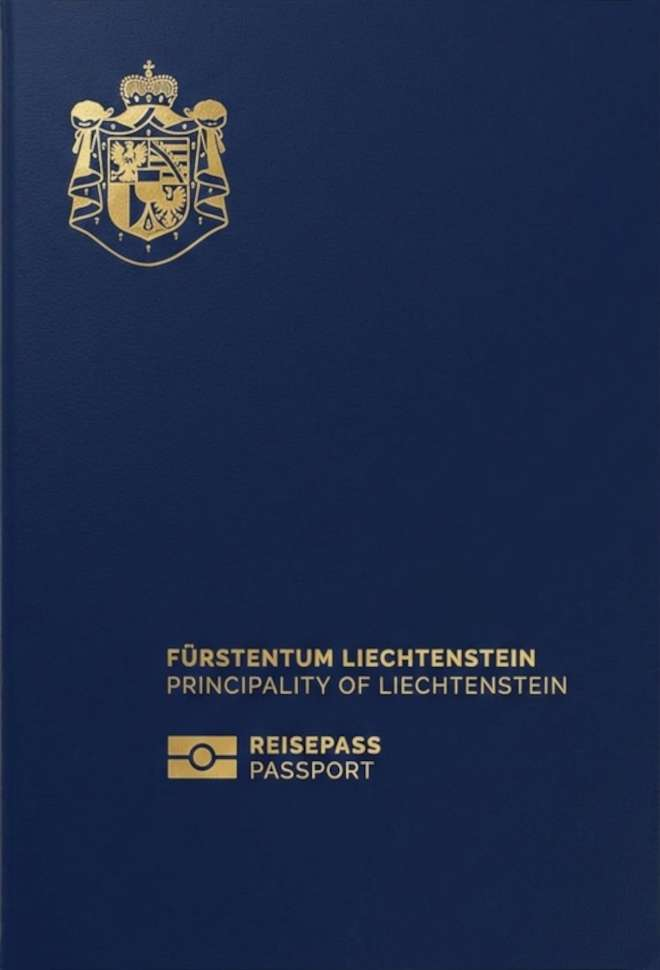
- The front cover of a contemporary Liechtenstein biometric passport

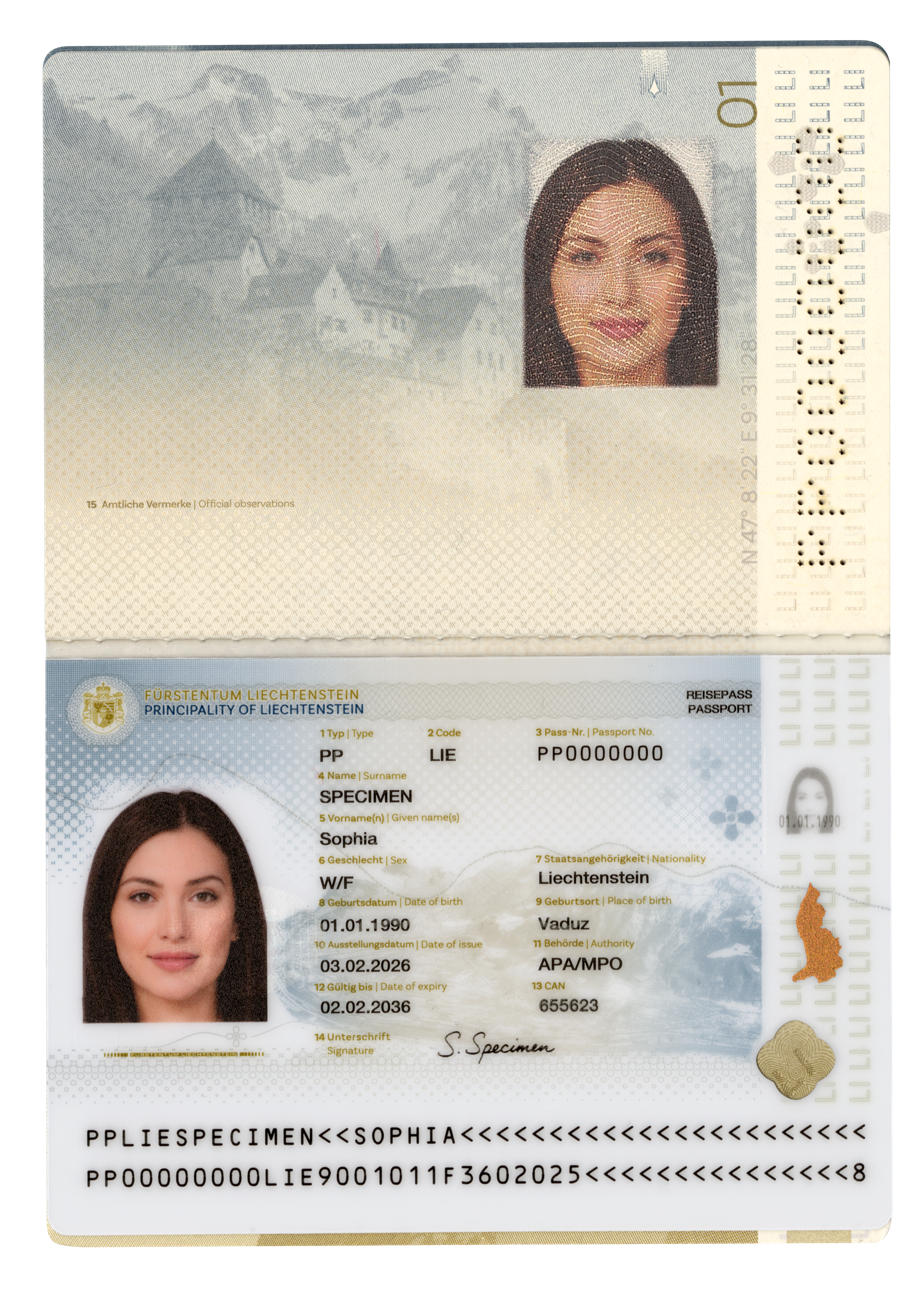
- The data page of a contemporary Liechtenstein biometric passport
- Type: Passport
- Issued by: Migration and Passport Office of the National Administration of Liechtenstein
- First issued: 26 October 2006
- Purpose: Identification, international travel
- Eligibility: Liechtensteiner citizenship
- Expiration: 5 years (Child aged 0-12) 10 years (Child aged 13-17) 10 years (Adult aged 18+)
- Cost: CHF60.00 (Child aged 0-12) CHF60.00 (Child aged 13-17) CHF140.00 (Adult aged 18+)

Liechtenstein passports are issued to nationals of Liechtenstein for the purpose of international travel. Beside serving as proof of Liechtenstein citizenship, they facilitate the process of securing assistance from Liechtenstein consular officials abroad (or missions of Switzerland in case a Liechtenstein representation is not available).

The passport, along with the Liechtenstein identity card allows for the freedom of movement in any of the states of EFTA and the EEA. This is because Liechtenstein is a member state of EFTA, and by virtue of it also being a member of the European Economic Area (EEA) and part of the Schengen Area.

== Physical appearance ==
Liechtenstein passports are blue with the coat of arms of Liechtenstein emblazoned in the centre. The words "FÜRSTENTUM LIECHTENSTEIN" (Principality of Liechtenstein) are inscribed above the coat of arms, with "REISEPASS" (passport) and the international biometric passport symbol below.

A new passport, designed by Anikó Stalder, is launched on 3 February 2026. It features scenic, cultural and historical motifs of Liechtenstein.

== Effect of Liechtenstein citizenship ==
Citizens of Liechtenstein are allowed to reside in Switzerland. Additionally, as a member of the European Economic Area (EEA), citizens of Liechtenstein are permitted to take up residence in any EEA member state.

Citizens of EEA member states, which consist of the European Union and three of the four European Free Trade Association states (Iceland, Liechtenstein, and Norway) enjoy the freedom to travel and work in any EEA country without a visa, although transitory dispositions may restrict the rights of citizens of new member states to work in other countries.

== Visa requirements ==
Visa requirements for Liechtenstein citizens Liechtenstein Freedom of movement Visa-free / ESTA / eTA / eVisitor eVisa Visa may be obtained online or on arrival Visa on arrival Visa must be obtained in advance

As of March 2020, Liechtenstein citizens had visa-free or visa on arrival access to 179 countries and territories, ranking the Liechtenstein passport 12th in terms of travel freedom overall, and the lowest of the EFTA member states, according to the Henley Passport Index.

In 2017, The Liechtenstein nationality is ranked fourteenth in The Quality of Nationality Index (QNI). This index differs from the Visa Restrictions Index, which focuses on external factors including travel freedom. The QNI considers, in addition, to travel freedom on internal factors such as peace & stability, economic strength, and human development as well.

As a member state of the European Free Trade Association (EFTA), Liechtenstein citizens enjoy freedom of movement to live and work in other EFTA countries in accordance with the EFTA convention. Moreover, by virtue of Liechtenstein's membership of the European Economic Area (EEA), Liechtenstein citizens also enjoy freedom of movement within all EEA member states. The Citizens’ Rights Directive defines the right of free movement for citizens of the EEA, and all EFTA and EU citizens are not only visa-exempt but are legally entitled to enter and reside in each other's countries.

== Passport gallery ==
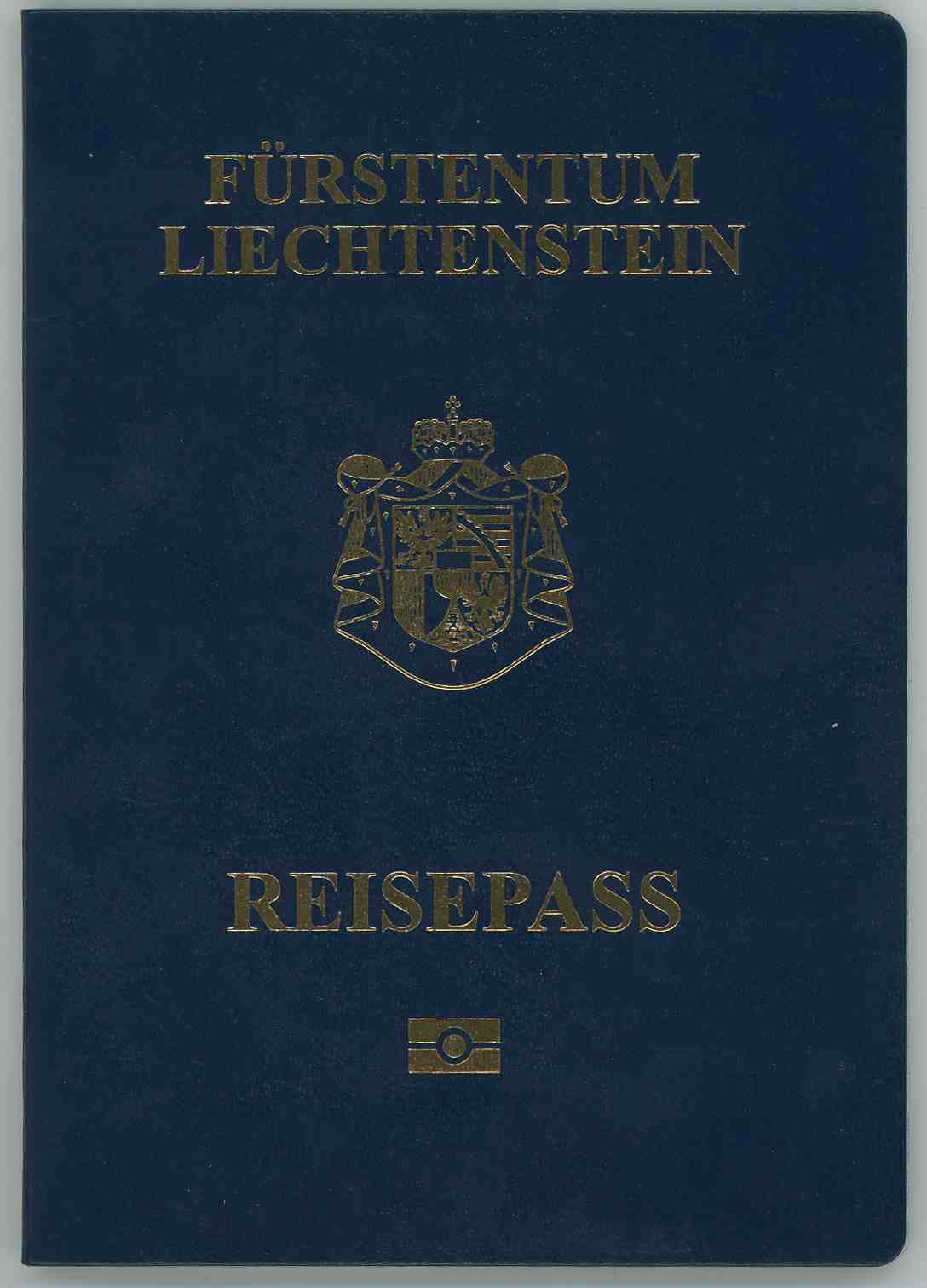
Cover of a first-generation Liechtenstein biometric passport. Cover is blue colour with a gold-coloured crest. Text reads "FÜRSTENTUM LIECHTENSTEIN" above the crest and "REISEPASS" below.

Data page design of the first-generation Liechtenstein biometric passport

== See also ==
- Visa requirements for Liechtenstein citizens
- Liechtenstein identity card
- European Free Trade Association
- Passports of the EFTA member states
