= Liechtenstein identity card =

National identity card of Liechtenstein

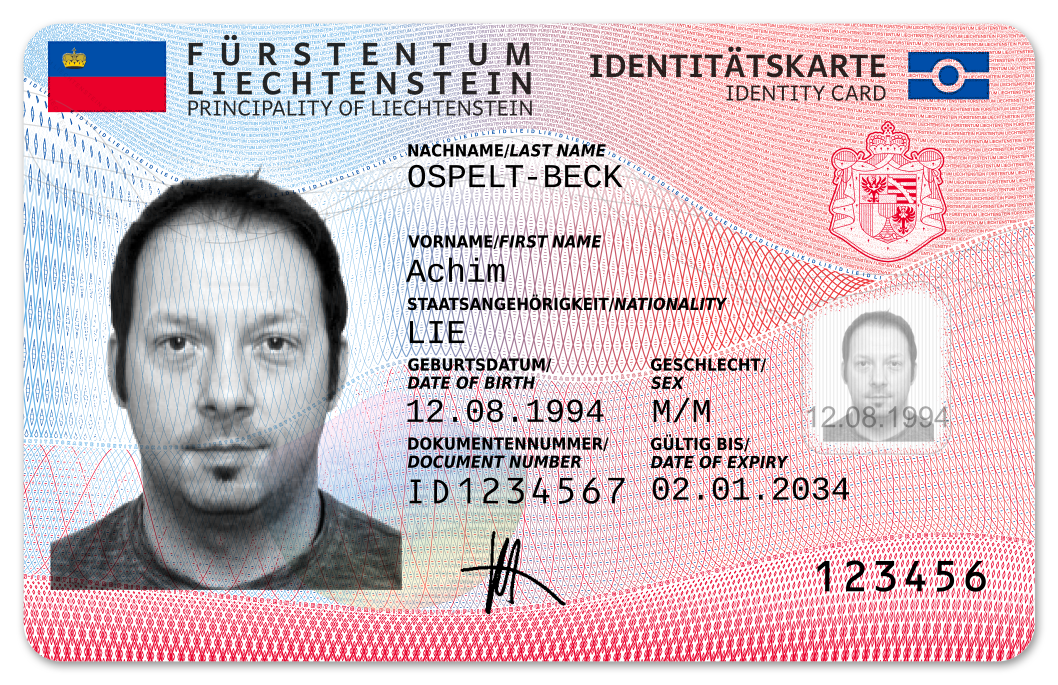
- Liechtenstein identity card (Front)

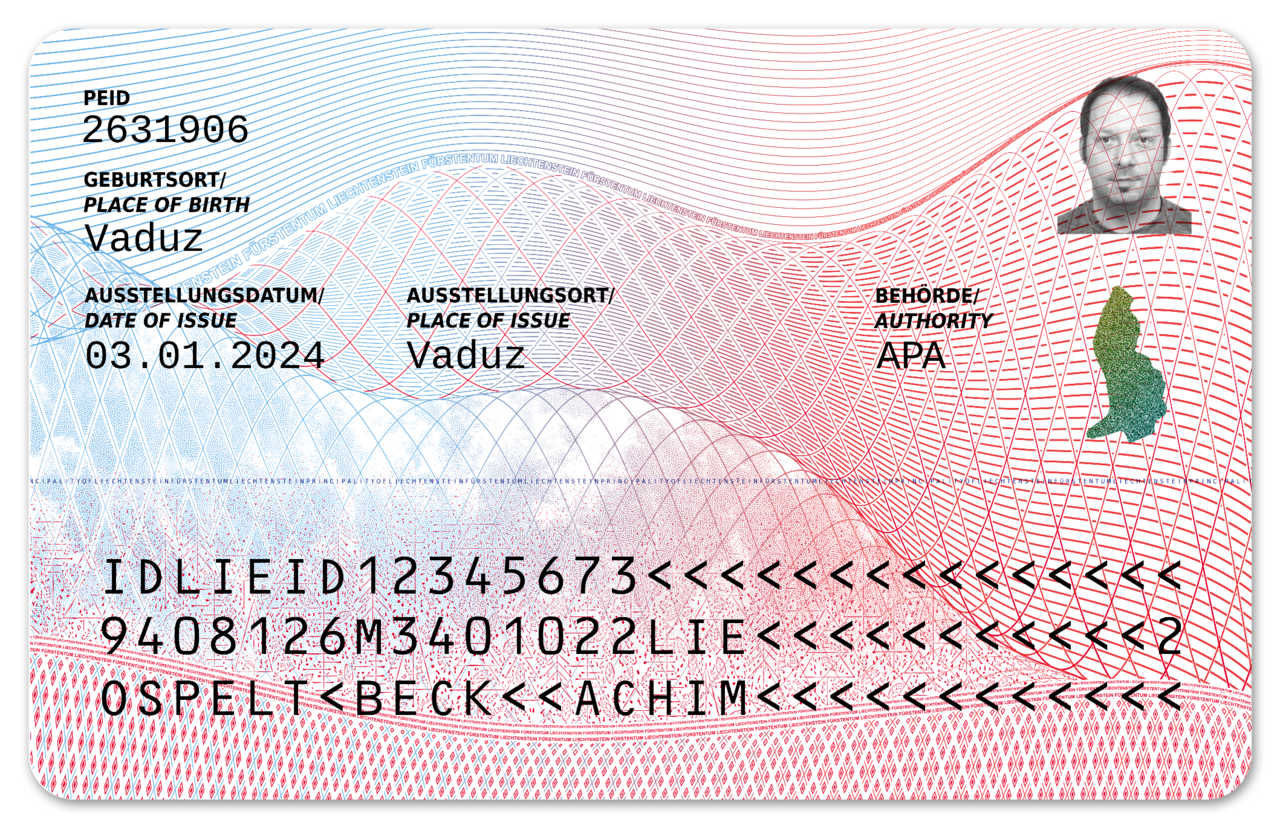
- Liechtenstein identity card (Back)
- Type: Identity card, optional replacement for passport in the listed countries
- Issued by: Liechtenstein
- Valid in: EFTA; European Union; United Kingdom (EU Settlement Scheme); Rest of Europe (except Belarus, Russia and Ukraine) Georgia; Montserrat (max. 14 days); Overseas France; Turkey
- Expiration: 10 years for adults; 3 years for children
- Cost: CHF 65 for nationals 18 years old or older; CHF 30 for children

The Liechtenstein identity card (in German: Identitätskarte Liechtenstein) is issued to Liechtenstein citizens by the Immigration and Passport Office in Vaduz. The card costs CHF65 for adults aged 18 or over and is valid for 10 years. For children, the card costs CHF30 and has a validity of 3 years.

Holders of a Liechtenstein identity card can apply to use lisign, a service facilitating the use of electronic verification and signatures.

On the 3rd of January 2024, Liechtenstein began issuing new biometric identity cards, compliant with new EU standards. Older Identity cards will be valid until their expiry.

== Travel document ==
As a member state of the European Free Trade Association (EFTA), Liechtenstein citizens enjoy freedom of movement to live and work in other EFTA countries in accordance with the EFTA convention. Moreover, by virtue of Liechtenstein's membership of the European Economic Area (EEA), Liechtenstein citizens also enjoy freedom of movement within all EEA member states.

As an alternative to presenting a passport, Liechtenstein citizens are entitled to use a valid national identity card to exercise their right of free movement in EFTA and the European Economic Area. Strictly speaking, it is not necessary for an EEA or Swiss citizen to possess a valid national identity card or passport to enter the EEA and Switzerland. In theory, if an EEA or Swiss citizen can prove their nationality by any other means (e.g. by presenting an expired national identity card or passport, or a citizenship certificate), they must be permitted to enter the EEA and Switzerland. An EEA or Swiss citizen who is unable to demonstrate their nationality satisfactorily must, nonetheless, be given 'every reasonable opportunity' to obtain the necessary documents or to have them delivered within a reasonable period of time.

== See also ==
- Liechtenstein passport
- National identity cards in the European Economic Area
