= Visa requirements for Liechtenstein citizens =

Administrative entry restrictions

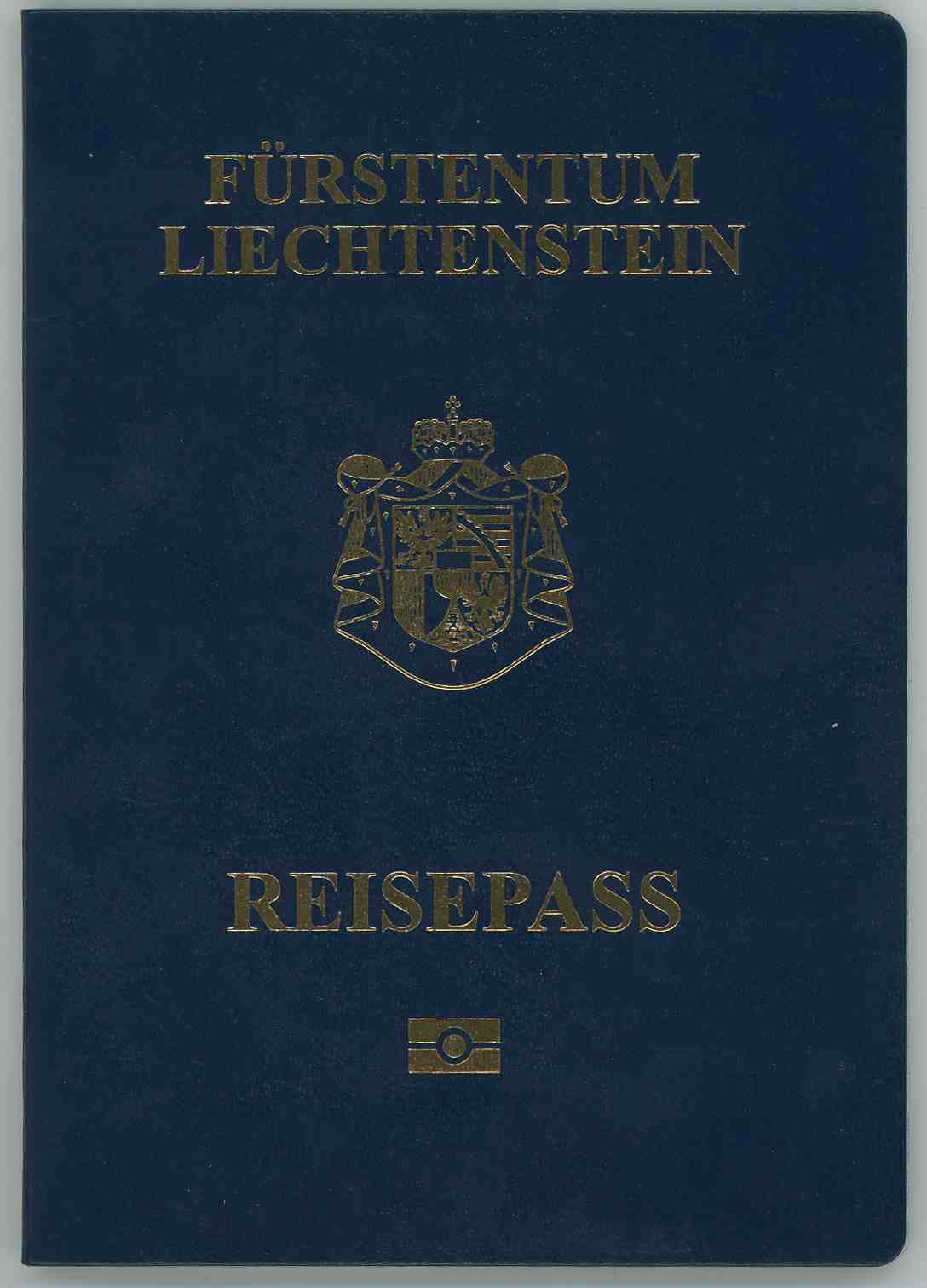
A Liechtenstein passport

Visa requirements for Liechtenstein citizens are administrative entry restrictions by the authorities of other states placed on citizens of Liechtenstein.

As of 2026, Liechtenstein citizens have visa-free or visa on arrival access to 180 countries and territories, ranking the Liechtenstein passport 9th in terms of travel freedom overall, and the lowest of the EFTA member states, according to the Henley Passport Index.

As a member state of the European Free Trade Association (EFTA), Liechtenstein citizens enjoy freedom of movement to live and work in other EFTA countries in accordance with the EFTA convention. Moreover, by virtue of Liechtenstein's membership of the European Economic Area (EEA), Liechtenstein citizens also enjoy freedom of movement within all EEA member states. The Citizens’ Rights Directive defines the right of free movement for citizens of the EEA, and all EFTA and EU citizens are not only visa-exempt but are legally entitled to enter and reside in each other's countries.

In order to travel to another country, a Liechtenstein citizen requires a passport, except travel to all European Union member states, all EFTA member states, Albania, Andorra, Bosnia and Herzegovina, Monaco, Montenegro, North Macedonia, San Marino, Serbia, Turkey, and Vatican City where the Liechtenstein identity card is valid.

== Visa requirements map ==
Visa requirements for holders of regular Liechtenstein passports Liechtenstein Freedom of movement Visa-free / ESTA / eTA / eVisitor eVisa Visa may be obtained online or on arrival Visa on arrival Visa must be obtained in advance

== Visa requirements ==
Country	Visa requirement	Allowed stay	Notes (excluding departure fees)
Afghanistan	eVisa	30 days	Visa is not required in case born in Afghanistan or can proof that one of their parents is a national of Afghanistan or born in Afghanistan.; e-Visa : Visitors must arrive at Kabul International (KBL).
Albania	Visa not required	90 days	ID card valid
Algeria	Visa required		
Andorra	Visa not required		ID card valid
Angola	Visa required		
Antigua and Barbuda	Visa not required	6 months	
Argentina	Visa not required	90 days	
Armenia	Visa not required	180 days	
Australia	eVisitor	90 days	90 days on each visit in a 12-month period if granted
Austria	Visa not required	Freedom of movement; ID card valid	
Azerbaijan	eVisa	30 days	
Bahamas	Visa not required	8 months	
Bahrain	eVisa/Visa on arrival	14 days	
Bangladesh	eVisa / Visa on arrival	30 days	
Barbados	Visa not required	6 months	
Belarus	Visa not required	30 days	Visa-free until 31 December 2024.
Belgium	Visa not required	Freedom of movement; ID card valid	
Belize	Visa not required		
Benin	eVisa	30 days	Must have an international vaccination certificate.
Bhutan	eVisa		Must pay 100 USD per person per day forSustainable Development Fee
Bolivia	Visa not required	90 days	
Bosnia and Herzegovina	Visa not required	90 days	90 days within any 6-month period; ID card valid
Botswana	Visa not required	90 days	
Brazil	Visa not required	90 days	
Brunei	Visa not required	90 days	
Bulgaria	Visa not required	Freedom of movement; ID card valid	
Burkina Faso	eVisa	1 month	
Burundi	Visa on arrival	1 month	
Cambodia	eVisa / Visa on arrival	30 days	Visa is also obtainable online.
Cameroon	eVisa		
Canada	eTA / Visa not required	6 months	eTA required if arriving by air
Cape Verde	Visa not required	30 days	
Central African Republic	Visa required		
Chad	Visa required		
Chile	Visa not required	90 days	
China	Visa not required	30 days	Visa-free from 8 November, 2024 to 31 December, 2026.
Colombia	Visa not required	180 days	90 days - extendable up to 180-days stay within a one-year period
Comoros	Visa on arrival		
Republic of the Congo	Visa required		
Democratic Republic of the Congo	eVisa	7 days	
Costa Rica	Visa not required	90 days	
Côte d'Ivoire	eVisa	3 months	eVisa holders must arrive via Port Bouet Airport.
Croatia	Visa not required	Freedom of movement; ID card valid	
Cuba	eVisa/Tourist Card required	90 days	Can be extended to another 90 days
Cyprus	Visa not required	Freedom of movement; ID card valid	
Czech Republic	Visa not required	Freedom of movement; ID card valid	
Denmark	Visa not required	Freedom of movement (DK); ID card valid	
Djibouti	eVisa	31 days	
Dominica	Visa not required	6 months	
Dominican Republic	Visa not required	30 days	Can be extended up to 120 days with fee
Ecuador	Visa not required	90 days	
Egypt	Visa on arrival	30 days	
El Salvador	Visa not required	90 days	
Equatorial Guinea	eVisa		Must arrive via Malabo International Airport, processing fee 75 USD
Eritrea	Visa required		
Estonia	Visa not required	Freedom of movement; ID card valid	
Eswatini	Visa required		
Ethiopia	eVisa	up to 90 days	eVisa holders must arrive via Addis Ababa Bole International Airport
Fiji	Visa not required	4 months	
Finland	Visa not required	Freedom of movement; ID card valid	
France	Visa not required	Freedom of movement (in Regions of France); ID card valid	
Gabon	eVisa		Electronic visa holders must arrive via Libreville International Airport.
Gambia	Visa not required	90 days	
Georgia	Visa not required	1 year	ID card valid
Germany	Visa not required	Freedom of movement; ID card valid	
Ghana	Visa required		
Greece	Visa not required	Freedom of movement; ID card valid	
Grenada	Visa not required	3 months	
Guatemala	Visa not required	90 days	
Guinea	eVisa	90 days	
Guinea-Bissau	eVisa / Visa on arrival	90 days	
Guyana	Visa required		
Haiti	Visa not required	90 days	
Honduras	Visa not required	90 days	
Hungary	Visa not required	Freedom of movement; ID card valid	
Iceland	Visa not required	Freedom of movement; ID card valid	
India	e-Visa	60 days	e-Visa holders must arrive via 32 designated airports (Note: Ahmedabad; Amritsar; Bagdogra; Bengaluru; Bhubaneswar; Chandigarh; Chennai; Coimbatore; Delhi; Gaya; Goa-Dabolim; Goa-Manohar; Guwahati; Hyderabad; Indore; Jaipur; Kannur; Kochi; Kolkata; Kozhikode; Lucknow; Madurai; Mangaluru; Mumbai; Nagpur; Port Blair; Pune; Surat; Thiruvananthapuram; Tiruchirappalli; Varanasi; Visakhapatnam) or 5 designated seaports. (Note: Chennai; Cochin; Mormugao (Goa); Mumbai; Mangalore); An Indian e-Tourist Visa may only be obtained twice within 1 calendar year.; Foreigners of Pakistani origin or who hold a Pakistani Passport are not eligible for an e-Visa. Foreigners who are not Pakistani nationals, but whose parents or grandparents (either paternal or maternal) were born in, or were permanent residents in Pakistan, are also not eligible for an e-Visa.
Indonesia	Visa on arrival / eVisa	30 days	Select ports of entry.
Iran	eVisa	30 days	
Iraq	eVisa		
Ireland	Visa not required	Freedom of movement; ID card valid	
Israel	Electronic Travel Authorization	3 months	
Italy	Visa not required	Freedom of movement; ID card valid	
Jamaica	Visa not required	90 days	
Japan	Visa not required	90 days	
Jordan	eVisa / Visa on arrival	30 days	Conditions apply
Kazakhstan	Visa not required	30 days	
Kenya	Electronic Travel Authorization	3 months	
Kiribati	Visa not required	90 days	90 days within any 12 months period
North Korea	Visa required		
South Korea	Korean Electronic Travel Authorization	90 days	
Kuwait	eVisa / Visa on arrival	3 months	
Kyrgyzstan	Visa not required	60 days	
Laos	eVisa / Visa on arrival	30 days	18 (Note: Savannakhet Airport; Lanetoui - Mengkang (China); Meuangmom - Wan Pong (Myanmar); Banvang - Ban Khok Phai (Thailand); Namngeun - Huay Kon (Thailand); Paksan - Bueng Kan (Thailand); Paktaphan - Pak Saeng (Thailand); Pangmon - Ban Huak (Thailand); Phoudou (Thailand); Dak ta ock - Nam Giang (Vietnam); La Lai (Vietnam); Namkan (Vietnam); Namphao - Cau Treo (Vietnam); Namsoy - Na Meo (Vietnam); Naphao - Cha Lo (Vietnam); Pahang - Long Sap (Vietnam); Panghok - Tây Trang (Vietnam); Phoukeua - Bo Y (Vietnam)) of the 33 border crossings are only open to regular visa holders.; e-Visa may be used to enter Laos through the Luang Prabang, Pakse and Vientiane international airports, 3 Thai-Lao Friendship Bridges (Note: Vientiane (Friendship Bridge 1); Savannakhet (Friendship Bridge 2); Bokeo (Friendship Bridge 4)), in Boten (road and railroad), and in Vientiane (at Khamsavath railway station).; Visa on arrival is available at the Luang Prabang, Pakse and Vientiane international airports, 4 Thai-Lao Friendship Bridges (Note: Vientiane (Friendship Bridge 1); Savannakhet (Friendship Bridge 2); Khammouane (Friendship Bridge 3); Bokeo (Friendship Bridge 4)) and 7 border crossings. (Note: Nongnokkheane - Trapeang Kriel (Cambodia); Boten - Bo han (China); Golden Triangle/Samliemkham (Thailand); Khamsavath railway station (Thailand); Namheuang - Ban Na Kraseng (Thailand); Vang tao - Chongmek (Thailand); Dansavan - Lao Bảo (Vietnam))
Latvia	Visa not required	Freedom of movement; ID card valid	
Lebanon	Visa on arrival	1 month	Visa extendable for 2 additional months issued upon arrival; Granted free of charge at Beirut International Airport or any other port of entry if there is no Israeli visa or seal, holding a telephone number, an address in Lebanon, and a non refundable return or circle trip ticket.
Lesotho	eVisa	44 days	
Liberia	Visa required		
Libya	eVisa	30 days	
Lithuania	Visa not required	Freedom of movement; ID card valid	
Luxembourg	Visa not required	Freedom of movement; ID card valid	
Madagascar	eVisa / Visa on arrival	90 days	
Malawi	eVisa / Visa on arrival	90 days	
Malaysia	Visa not required	90 days	
Maldives	Visa on arrival	30 days	
Mali	Visa required		
Malta	Visa not required	Freedom of movement; ID card valid	
Marshall Islands	Visa on arrival	90 days	
Mauritania	eVisa		Available at Nouakchott–Oumtounsy International Airport.
Mauritius	Visa not required	90 days	
Mexico	Visa not required	180 days	
Micronesia	Visa not required	90 days	90 days within any 180 day period
Moldova	Visa not required	90 days	90 days within any 180 days period; ID card valid
Monaco	Visa not required		ID card valid
Mongolia	Visa not required	30 days	
Montenegro	Visa not required	90 days	ID card valid for 30 days
Morocco	Visa not required	30 days	
Mozambique	eVisa / Visa on arrival	30 days	
Myanmar	Visa required		
Namibia	eVisa/ Visa on arrival	3 months	3 months within a calendar year
Nauru	Visa required		
Nepal	eVisa / Visa on arrival	90 days	
Netherlands	Visa not required	Freedom of movement (European Netherlands); ID card valid	
New Zealand	Electronic Travel Authority	3 months	International Visitor Conservation and Tourism Levy must be paid upon requesting an Electronic Travel Authority.; Holders of an Australian Permanent Resident Visa or Resident Return Visa may be granted a New Zealand Resident Visa on arrival permitting indefinite stay (pursuant to the Trans-Tasman Travel Arrangement), subject to meeting character requirements and obtaining an Electronic Travel Authority prior to departure. Such travellers are not required to pay the International Visitor Conservation and Tourism Levy.
Nicaragua	Visa not required	90 days	
Niger	Visa required		
Nigeria	eVisa		
North Macedonia	Visa not required	90 days	ID card valid
Norway	Visa not required	Freedom of movement; ID card valid	
Oman	eVisa	30 days	
Pakistan	eVisa	90 days	
Palau	Visa on arrival	30 days	
Panama	Visa not required	180 days	
Papua New Guinea	eVisa / Free visa on arrival	60 days	
Paraguay	Visa not required	90 days	
Peru	Visa not required	90 days	
Philippines	Visa not required	30 days	
Poland	Visa not required	Freedom of movement; ID card valid	
Portugal	Visa not required	Freedom of movement; ID card valid	
Qatar	Visa not required	90 days	
Romania	Visa not required	Freedom of movement; ID card valid	
Russia	eVisa	30 days	e-Visa holders must arrive and departure via 29 checkpoints
Rwanda	eVisa / Visa on arrival		
Saint Kitts and Nevis	Electronic Travel Authorisation	3 months	
Saint Lucia	Visa not required	6 weeks	
Saint Vincent and the Grenadines	Visa not required	1 month	
Samoa	Entry Permit on arrival	60 days	
San Marino	Visa not required		ID card valid
São Tomé and Príncipe	Visa not required	15 days	
Saudi Arabia	eVisa / Visa on arrival	90 days	
Senegal	Visa on arrival	90 days	
Serbia	Visa not required	90 days	90 days within any 6-month period; ID card valid
Seychelles	Visa not required	3 months	
Sierra Leone	eVisa / Visa on arrival		
Singapore	Visa not required	30 days	
Slovenia	Visa not required	Freedom of movement; ID card valid	
Slovakia	Visa not required	Freedom of movement; ID card valid	
Solomon Islands	Free Visitor's permit on arrival	3 months	
Somalia	eVisa		Available at Berbera, Borama, Burao, Erigavo and Hargeisa airports.; 30 days, available at Bosaso Airport, Galcaio Airport and Mogadishu Airport.
South Africa	Visa not required	90 days	
South Sudan	eVisa		Obtainable online; Printed visa authorization must be presented at the time of travel
Spain	Visa not required	Freedom of movement; ID card valid	
Sri Lanka	ETA/ Visa on arrival	30 days	Electronic Travel Authorization can also be obtained on arrival.; 30 days extendable to 6 months.; The standard visitor visa allows a stay of 60 days within any 6-month period.; Visa fees (for Standard visitor visa): SAARC - USD 35; Non SAARC - USD 75; e-Visa categories will be charged an additional USD 18.50 service fee.; If transiting from any of the Sri Lankan airports, An e-Visa is exempted (2 day transit period).
Sudan	Visa required		
Suriname	E-tourist card	90 days	Multiple entry eVisa is also available.
Sweden	Visa not required	Freedom of movement; ID card valid	
Switzerland	Visa not required	Freedom of movement; ID card valid	
Syria	eVisa		
Tajikistan	Visa not required	30 days	Visa also available online.; E-visa holders can enter through all border points.
Tanzania	eVisa / Visa on arrival	3 months	
Thailand	Visa not required	60 days	Maximum two visits annually if not arriving by air.
Timor-Leste	Visa on arrival	30 days	
Togo	eVisa	15 days	
Tonga	Visa not required	90 days	90 days within any 180 day period
Trinidad and Tobago	Visa not required	90 days	90 days within any 180 day period
Tunisia	Visa not required	3 months	
Turkey	Visa not required	90 days	ID card valid
Turkmenistan	eVisa		
Tuvalu	Visa not required	90 days	90 days within any 180 day period
Uganda	eVisa / Visa on arrival		May apply online.
Ukraine	Visa not required	90 days	90 days within any 180 day period
United Arab Emirates	Visa not required	90 days	90 days within any 180 day period
United Kingdom	Electronic Travel Authorisation	6 months	
United States	Visa Waiver Program	90 days	On arrival from overseas; ESTA (valid for 2 years when issued) required if arriving by air or cruise ship.
Uruguay	Visa not required	90 days	
Uzbekistan	Visa not required	30 days	
Vanuatu	Visa not required	30 days	
Vatican City	Visa not required		ID card valid
Venezuela	Visa not required	90 days	
Vietnam	eVisa	30 days	
Yemen	Visa required		
Zambia	Visa not required	90 days	Also eligible for a universal visa allowing access to Zimbabwe.
Zimbabwe	eVisa / Visa on arrival	3 months	Also eligible for a universal visa allowing access to Zambia.

=== Dependent, disputed, or restricted territories ===
Visa requirements for Liechtenstein citizens for visits to various territories, disputed areas, partially recognized countries and restricted zones:

Visitor to	Visa requirement	Notes (excluding departure fees)
Kosovo	Visa not required	90 days; ID card valid
North Cyprus	Visa not required	90 days
Hong Kong	Visa not required	90 days
Macao	Visa not required	90 days
Taiwan	Visa not required	90 days

== Consular protection of Liechtensteiner citizens abroad ==
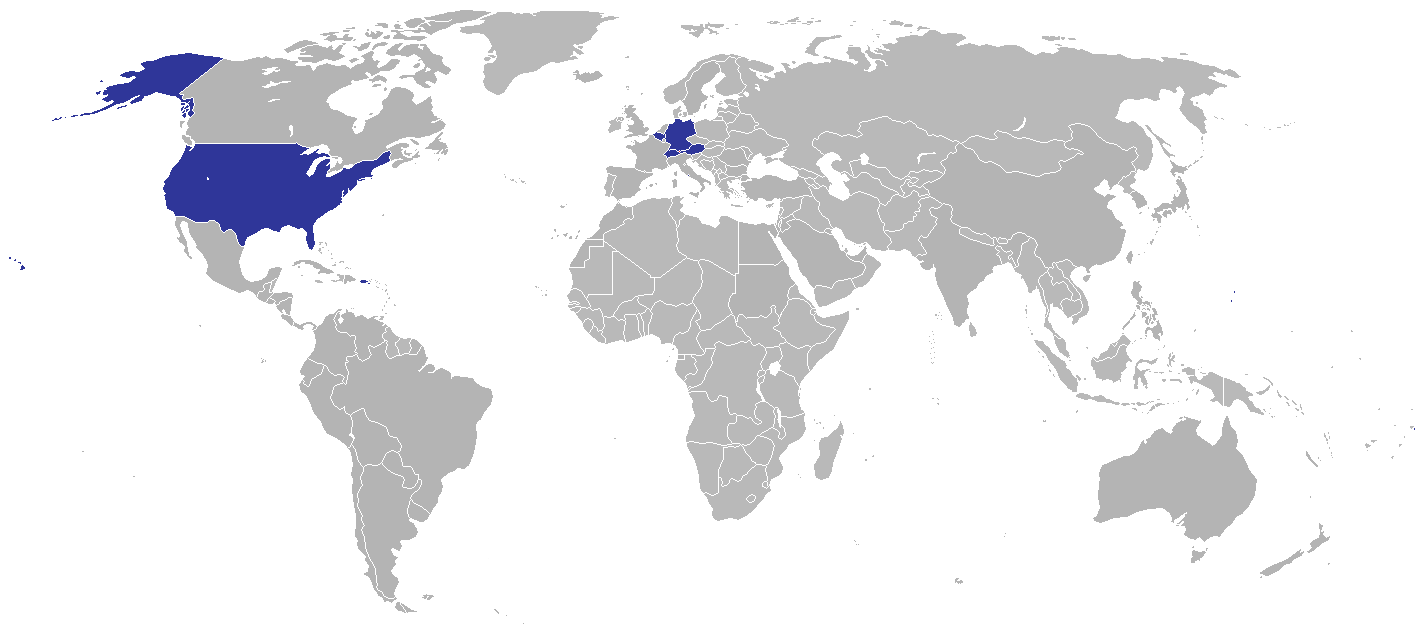
Diplomatic missions of Liechtenstein

There are Liechtensteinian embassies in Austria, Belgium, Germany, Switzerland, and the United States of America.

Since 1919, Switzerland has represented Liechtenstein in those countries wherein Liechtenstein itself does not maintain consular representation.
See also List of diplomatic missions of Liechtenstein.

== Non-visa restrictions ==
=== Blank passport pages ===
Many countries require a minimum number of blank pages to be available in the passport being presented, typically one or two pages. Endorsement pages, which often appear after the visa pages, are not counted as being valid or available.

=== Vaccination ===
Cover of the new International Certificate of Vaccination issued by the Bureau of Quarantine in the Philippines since 2021

The African countries of Angola, Benin, Burkina Faso, Burundi, Cameroon, Central African Republic, Democratic Republic of the Congo, Republic of the Congo, Côte d'Ivoire, Gabon, Ghana, Guinea-Bissau, Mali, Niger, Sierra Leone and Togo, South Sudan and Uganda, along with French Guiana in South America, require all incoming passengers older than nine months to one year, to have a current International Certificate of Vaccination or Prophylaxis.

Some other countries require vaccination only if the passenger is coming from an infected area or has visited one recently or has transited for 12 hours in those countries: Algeria, Botswana, Cabo Verde, Chad, Djibouti, Egypt, Eswatini, Ethiopia, Gambia, Ghana, Guinea, Lesotho, Libya, Equatorial Guinea, Eritrea, Madagascar, Malawi, Mauritania, Mauritius, Mozambique, Namibia, Nigeria, Papua New Guinea, Seychelles, Somalia, South Africa, Sudan, Tunisia, Uganda, Tanzania, Zambia and Zimbabwe.

=== Passport validity length ===
Very few countries, such as Paraguay, just require a valid passport on arrival.

However many countries and groupings now require only an identity card – especially from their neighbours. Other countries may have special bilateral arrangements that depart from the generality of their passport validity length policies to shorten the period of passport validity required for each other's citizens or even accept passports that have already expired (but not been cancelled).

Some countries, such as Japan, Ireland and the United Kingdom, require a passport valid throughout the period of the intended stay.

In the absence of specific bilateral agreements, countries requiring passports to be valid for at least 6 more months on arrival include Afghanistan, Algeria, Anguilla, Bahrain, Bhutan, Botswana, British Virgin Islands, Brunei, Cambodia, Cameroon, Cape Verde, Cayman Islands, Central African Republic, Chad, Comoros, Costa Rica, Côte d'Ivoire, Curaçao, Ecuador, Egypt, El Salvador, Equatorial Guinea, Fiji, Gabon, Guinea Bissau, Guyana, Haiti, India, Indonesia, Iran, Iraq, Israel, Jordan, Kenya, Kiribati, Kuwait, Laos, Madagascar, Malaysia, Marshall Islands, Mongolia, Myanmar, Namibia, Nepal, Nicaragua, Nigeria, Oman, Palau, Papua New Guinea, Peru, Philippines, Qatar, Rwanda, Samoa, Saudi Arabia, Singapore, Solomon Islands, Somalia, Sri Lanka, Sudan, Suriname, Tanzania, Thailand, Timor-Leste, Tokelau, Tonga, Turkey, Tuvalu, Uganda, United Arab Emirates, Vanuatu, Venezuela, and Vietnam.

Countries requiring passports valid for at least 4 months on arrival include Micronesia and Zambia.

Countries requiring passports with a validity of at least 3 months beyond the date of intended departure include Azerbaijan, Bosnia and Herzegovina, Honduras, Montenegro, Nauru, Moldova and New Zealand. Similarly, the EEA countries of Iceland, Liechtenstein, Norway, all European Union countries (except Ireland) together with Switzerland also require 3 months validity beyond the date of the bearer's intended departure unless the bearer is an EEA or Swiss national.

Countries requiring passports valid for at least 3 months on arrival include Albania, North Macedonia, Panama, and Senegal.

Bermuda requires passports to be valid for at least 45 days upon entry.

Countries that require a passport validity of at least one month beyond the date of intended departure include Eritrea, Hong Kong, Lebanon, Macau, the Maldives and South Africa.

==== Maximum passport age ====
Countries of the Schengen area require non-EU passports to be less than 10 years old upon entry.

=== Criminal record ===
Some countries, including Australia, Canada, Fiji, New Zealand and the United States, routinely deny entry to non-citizens who have a criminal record, while others impose restrictions depending on the type of conviction and the length of the sentence.

=== Persona non grata ===
The government of a country can declare a diplomat persona non grata, banning them from entering the country or expelling them if they have already entered. In non-diplomatic use, the authorities of a country may also declare a foreigner persona non grata permanently or temporarily, usually because of unlawful activity.

=== Israeli stamps ===
Kuwait, Lebanon, Libya, and Yemen do not allow entry to people with passport stamps from Israel or whose passports have either a used or an unused Israeli visa, or where there is evidence of previous travel to Israel such as entry or exit stamps from neighbouring border posts in transit countries such as Jordan and Egypt.

To circumvent this Arab League boycott of Israel, the Israeli immigration services have now mostly ceased to stamp foreign nationals' passports on either entry to or exit from Israel (unless the entry is for some work-related purposes). Since 15 January 2013, Israel no longer stamps foreign passports at Ben Gurion Airport. Passports are still (as of 22 June 2017) stamped at Erez when passing into and out of Gaza.

Iran refuses admission to holders of passports containing an Israeli visa or stamp that is less than 12 months old.

=== Biometrics ===
Several countries mandate that all travellers, or all foreign travellers, be fingerprinted on arrival and will refuse admission to or even arrest travellers who refuse to comply. In some countries, such as the United States, this may apply even to transit passengers who merely wish to change planes rather than go landside.

Fingerprinting countries/regions include Afghanistan, Argentina, Brunei, Cambodia, China, Ethiopia, Ghana, Guinea, India, Japan, Kenya (both fingerprints and a photo are taken), Malaysia upon entry and departure, Mongolia, Saudi Arabia, the Schengen Area, Singapore, South Korea, Taiwan, Thailand, Uganda, the United Arab Emirates and the United States.

Many countries also require a photo be taken of people entering the country. The United States, which does not fully implement exit control formalities at its land frontiers (although long mandated by its own legislation), intends to implement facial recognition for passengers departing from international airports to identify people who overstay their visa.

Together with fingerprint and face recognition, iris scanning is one of three biometric identification technologies internationally standardised since 2006 by the International Civil Aviation Organization (ICAO) for use in e-passports and the United Arab Emirates conducts iris scanning on visitors who need to apply for a visa. The United States Department of Homeland Security has announced plans to greatly increase the biometric data it collects at US borders. In 2018, Singapore began trials of iris scanning at three land and maritime immigration checkpoints.

== See also ==
- Liechtenstein passport
- Visa requirements for EFTA nationals
- Visa policy of the Schengen Area

== Notes and references ==
Notes
