= Liechtensteiner nationality law =

On the Acquisition and Loss of Citizenship über den Erwerb und Verlust des Landesbürgerrechtes

Landtag of Liechtenstein
- Citation: LBGl at 1960.023
- Territorial extent: Liechtenstein
- Enacted by: Landtag of Liechtenstein
- Enacted: 4 January 1934
- Commenced: 4 January 1934
- Status: Amended

The primary law governing nationality of Liechtenstein is the Law on the Acquisition and Loss of Citizenship, which came into force on 4 January 1934. Liechtenstein is a member state of the European Free Trade Association (EFTA). All Liechtensteiner nationals have automatic and permanent permission to live and work in any European Union (EU) or EFTA country.

Any person born to at least one married Liechtensteiner parent receives citizenship at birth, regardless of the place of birth. Children of unmarried couples in which only the father is Liechtensteiner acquire a right to claim citizenship retroactive to their date of birth, while those born to unmarried Liechtensteiner mothers acquire citizenship at birth automatically. Foreign nationals may become Liechtenstein citizens by naturalisation after meeting a minimum residence requirement, renouncing any previous nationalities, and demonstrating proficiency in the German language.

Under Liechtenstein's ordinary naturalisation process, the statutory residence period is 10 years. However, this requires approval from the electorate of a local municipality and it is highly unlikely for anyone to succeed through the voting process. In practice, citizenship may be acquired without voter consent through facilitated naturalisation, which requires either living in the country for at least 30 years (residence under age 20 counting as double) or marriage to a Liechtensteiner citizen, which has a lower residence requirement (between 5 and 10 years).

== History ==
=== Medieval and early modern period ===
Until the early 19th century, German lands constituted the core part of the highly decentralised Holy Roman Empire. Each of the roughly 1,800 individual political entities within the Empire had varying (or non-existent) definitions on who they considered to be members of their polity. "Citizenship" in this context was tied to a person's settlement in a particular municipality and individuals found outside of their ordinary places of residence could be deported to other parts of imperial territory.

Admission into and departure from the principality was strictly controlled; any person wishing to enter Liechtenstein was required to purchase their acceptance into the league of feudal bondsman who owed allegiance to the local lord. Rural communities in Liechtenstein additionally restricted the number of new citizens with entrance fees that were required for individuals to participate in local village cooperatives. A woman who married outside of her village automatically lost her previous cooperative rights and her husband was required to pay for her rights in his local community. The fees to bring in a wife from another Liechtenstein municipality were much lower than for a foreign wife. Children automatically acquired the village rights of their fathers at the time of birth. Individuals who were Liechtensteiner subjects but did not belong to a local community were known as Hintersassen.

The modern concept of citizenship, as a formal and legal relationship between an individual and a state that confers privileges to holders and a status that persists beyond continued territorial residence, emerged during the French Revolution. Following the dissolution of the Holy Roman Empire in 1806, this model of citizenship was imported into the German territories that became part of the French-led Confederation of the Rhine, though any applicable legislation from this period was repealed in the 1810s shortly after French defeat in the Napoleonic Wars. Outside of this Confederation, Austria enacted its first codified regulations based on the modern citizenship concept in 1811. Due to close ties between the Liechtenstein princes and the House of Habsburg, the country adopted the Austrian regulations in domestic law in 1812. Under this legislation, foreigners could acquire citizenship by entering the civil service, becoming employed in occupations that required residence in Liechtenstein, or residing within the principality for at least 10 years. Approval for a grant of citizenship was given at the discretion of the Prince or an appropriate court official. Children born to Liechtensteiner fathers automatically acquired citizenship at birth. The development and codification of nationality regulations during this time standardised the doctrine of coverture across Western Europe; a woman's consent to marry a foreigner was also assumed to be intent to denaturalise.

Legislative reforms in 1842 and 1843 formalised the concept of local citizenship (as opposed to Liechtenstein citizenship), which encompassed the cooperative rights traditionally granted by local villages and co-ownership of community assets. Local citizenship was automatically passed to children by descent or could be acquired by the purchase of a residence in a community. All other individuals could apply for admission as local citizens. Although not required by law, community administrations often demanded payment of a fee before proceeding with an application. Community assemblies (composed of every citizen eligible to vote) of the locality in which applicants intended to join subsequently deliberated on their admission. All applications were subject to final approval by the central government, which held discretionary power to veto any grant. Under the 1842/1843 revisions, new Liechtenstein citizens became required to swear an oath of allegiance to the state and submit documentary evidence detailing their birthplace, previous employment, and financial assets.

=== Policy alignment within the German Confederation ===
The Holy Roman Empire in 1789

The German Confederation in 1815

Regulations on nationality and citizenship developed at an uneven pace among the numerous vassal realms of the Holy Roman Empire and member states of the German Confederation, often resulting in inconsistent rules between the various German domains. As part of both political structures, Liechtenstein implemented local legislation that followed regulations in the wider region.

As a result of the Congress of Vienna, the German Confederation was created in 1815 as a permanent replacement for the Holy Roman Empire and included virtually all of the former Empire's territory. This political structure was not a federal state and sovereign power remained with the 38 individual member states. Each state continued to hold jurisdiction over citizenship, but the vast majority of them passed no specific codified laws on the subject until the mid-19th century.

Any applicable contemporary legislation in the Confederation was inconsistent among the states and generally ineffectual at determining the citizenship of a particular person. State regulations often assumed the existence of some type of citizenship that a child would inherit from their father at the time of their birth. However, any person born in the 18th century who would have been a citizen of an area of the Holy Roman Empire that no longer existed as a political entity would have had an undefined status in state law.

Conversely, every state had concluded by the 1820s at least one treaty with some or all other members of the Confederation that detailed the deportation of undesirable persons without state citizenship and process of "implicit naturalisation". A German who resided in another state for at least 10 years was considered to have been naturalised implicitly in their new place of domicile. An implicitly naturalised father would have automatically passed his changed citizenship status to his entire family. In seven states, this process was extended to any alien who fulfilled the minimum residence requirement. These interstate treaties additionally clarified the position of persons with unclear status, who were granted the contemporary existing citizenship of their birthplace (if that was uncertain, then the place where they were found). Germans lost their state citizenship if they left state territory with the intent to reside elsewhere permanently, had obtained formal permission to emigrate, or otherwise continuously lived outside of their home state for at least 10 years.

Theoretically, the Constitution of the German Confederation created a common German nationality. Article 18 of the document detailed a set of basic rights for every German; any subject of a German state was entitled to freely purchase property in any part of the Confederation, emigrate to other states willing to admit them, enlist in another state's armed forces or civil service, and were exempt from a tax on emigration. In practice, member states did not permit Germans from other states to freely immigrate into their territories, rendering these constitutional rights generally moot. The Frankfurt Parliament expanded on this idea of a unified German nationality; any state citizen of the short-lived 1848-1849 German Empire was also a German national, and all German nationals held the same rights as citizens of any German state.

Multilateral negotiations among the states resumed after the German Confederation was reconstituted in 1849. Prussia and 20 other states agreed on the Gotha Treaty in 1851, which lowered the residence requirement for implicit naturalisation to five years and introduced a formal distinction between emigration to other German states and emigration to jurisdictions outside of the Confederation. All German states had acceded to this treaty by 1861. Following the collapse of the German Confederation in 1866 as a result of the Austro-Prussian War, Liechtenstein abolished its military and became a neutral independent state. The majority of the remaining Confederation states joined the newly formed Prussian-led North German Confederation, which later became the German Empire in 1871.

=== Bought citizenships ===
Until 1864, it was possible for Liechtenstein citizens to not hold local citizenship. Beginning in that year, any person naturalising as a Liechtenstein citizen would be guaranteed to be accepted by a local community, provided that they could pay the entrance fees that these communities continued to charge. Liechtensteiner women who married foreign men automatically lost their Liechtenstein citizenship, and foreign women who married Liechtensteiner men became citizens. The 1864 changes also attempted to remedy the anomalous situation of the Hintersassen. While they were previously only able to become local citizens at the discretion of the communities, they became eligible to acquire that status by right, although only with payment of an entry charge. Some local communities persisted in rejecting integrating this group and demanded exorbitant fees to block their entry, leading to intervention by the central government.

Fees were only charged for obtaining local citizenship until 1920. Legislative reform in that year allowed the state to begin charging applicants for Liechtenstein citizenship a monetary fee, which would be at least 20 per cent of the fee levied by the municipalities. Additionally, the national government could waive the requirement for renouncing previous nationalities "in cases worthy of special consideration". The fees for these "bought citizenships" were constantly increased; each applicant could expect to pay 15,000 Swiss francs for local citizenship and 7,500 for national citizenship in 1934, rising to 25,000 and 12,500 francs by 1938. Applicants for this pathway to citizenship were not required to reside in Liechtenstein nor did they need to have any family connections to the country, but also did not receive a local citizenship as part of the naturalisation process. Children born to individuals with a purchased citizenship received citizenship by descent as normal, which led to further grants of citizenship by purchase being restricted only to persons aged 50 or older in 1938.

Switzerland and Germany were highly critical of this citizenship pathway, particularly for its lack of requirement for residence. Although a period of three years of residence became technically required under the 1934 revision of nationality law, this was never enforced. Switzerland continued to voice concern over this method of naturalisation and later requested that their government be granted the authority to approve new grants of Liechtenstein citizenship. Liechtenstein conceded this in 1941 under an immigration agreement signed with the Swiss that also established free movement of persons between the two countries. On the other hand, Switzerland maintained a right under this agreement to process a naturalisation for a foreigner resident in Switzerland as a Liechtenstein citizen; the Swiss government could circumvent its own stringent nationality law so that it could effectively naturalise high value tax residents.

In the 1955 Nottebohm case, the International Court of Justice ruled that Guatemala had no obligation to grant diplomatic protection to a Liechtenstein national who had obtained that nationality without a period of residence in the country. Following this ruling, Liechtenstein ceased further grants of citizenship by purchase. The legislature fully removed the legal provisions for this pathway and raised the requisite residence period from three to five years in 1960.

=== Facilitated naturalisation pathway ===
Following the Second World War, the proportion of foreigners in Liechtenstein rose to 25 per cent of the resident population. Immigration policy at that time was to routinely deny family permits to resident foreigners, even those who were married to Liechtensteiner women. Between 1946 and 1974, over 50 per cent of all Liechtenstein women married foreigners, effectively expelling them from the national constituency and making an ever larger proportion of the descendant population foreign nationals. Regulations were amended in 1960 to allow only Liechtensteiner women who married stateless men to retain their citizenship. By 1970, foreigners made up 33 per cent of the population.

To address the growing population imbalance, the Landtag amended the citizenship law in 1974 to remove automatic denaturalisation from Liechtensteiner women who married foreign men, although children born to such couples would continue to acquire foreign nationality at birth. Foreign women who married Liechtensteiner men had long been granted citizenship automatically at the time of marriage until this pathway was abolished in 1984. They instead qualified for a new process of facilitated naturalisation after living in the country for at least 12 years, with any time of residence while married counting as double; this was amended to include foreign men married to Liechtensteiner women in 1996. Children of Liechtenstein mothers and foreign fathers became eligible for facilitated naturalisation in 1986, although with a 30-year residence requirement with time spent in the country under age 20 counting as double; individuals born to such couples after 1996 automatically acquire Liechtensteiner citizenship at birth.

These reforms contributed to a slight reduction in the percentage of resident foreigners, falling from 39.1 per cent in 1995 to 34.3 per cent in 1997. The facilitated naturalisation pathway with a 30-year residence requirement was expanded in 2000 to include foreign national residents without family connections to Liechtenstein citizens. For individuals married to Liechtenstein citizens, the residence requirement was reduced in 2008 from 12 to 10 years. All naturalisation candidates have been required to demonstrate profiency in the German language since 2008.

=== European integration ===
Liechtensteiner citizens have free movement rights in the EEA and Switzerland. EU member states are shown in blue, EFTA in green, and Switzerland in yellow.

Traditionally allied to the Habsburg monarchy, Liechtenstein was part of a customs union with Austria from 1852 to 1919. Following the First World War, Liechtenstein ended this arrangement with Austria and entered into a separate customs union with Switzerland in 1923. Although Switzerland joined the European Free Trade Association in 1960, Liechtenstein did not become a member state until 1991. The principality participated informally in the EFTA through its customs union with Switzerland.

The formation of the European Union in 1992 and consequent creation of EU citizenship allowed nationals of all EU countries to live and work in any other member state. The scope of these free movement rights was expanded with the establishment of the European Economic Area (EEA) in 1994 to include nationals of all EEA member states, which included the entire EFTA except Liechtenstein and Switzerland. Following the 1992 Swiss referendum rejecting EEA membership, Liechtenstein renegotiated its customs union with Switzerland to allow for sole participation in the EEA, which it acceded to in 1995. Switzerland concluded a separate free movement agreement with the EU that came into force in 2002. Given Liechtenstein's small geographic and population size, the principality continues to restrict immigration with agreement by the EEA; citizens from other EU/EFTA countries cannot freely settle in Liechtenstein.

== Acquisition and loss of nationality ==
=== Entitlement by descent or adoption ===
Any person born to at least one parent who is a Liechtensteiner citizen automatically receives Liechtensteiner citizenship at birth. Individuals born to unmarried mothers who are Liechtensteiner citizens also receive citizenship automatically at birth, while those born to unmarried fathers have a right to claim citizenship retroactive to their date of birth. Abandoned children found in the country are presumed to have been born as Liechtensteiner citizens, and adopted children acquire citizenship at the time of adoption.

Until 1974, Liechtensteiner women who married foreign men automatically lost their Liechtenstein citizenship. Consequently, children resulting from these marriages would not have been Liechtensteiner citizens at birth. Even after 1974, citizenship by descent was transmitted exclusively through the male line. Only children of married Liechtensteiner fathers and unmarried Liechtensteiner women received citizenship at birth until this was amended in 1996 to remove the legislative gender imbalance.

=== Naturalisation ===
Number of successful naturalisation candidates between 2016 and 2023
- Ordinary
- Marriage
- Long-term residence

Noncitizens who are married to Liechtensteiner citizens may become citizens by facilitated naturalisation after living in the country for at least 10 years. The time of residence after marriage counts as double towards this requirement, making five years the minimum period of domicile. Individuals resident in the country for at least 30 years also hold a right to facilitated naturalisation, with time spent in the country before the age of 20 counting as double. Stateless individuals born in Liechtenstein who have been resident for least five years are eligible as well. Foreigners who become citizens by marriage also acquire the municipal citizenship of their spouses, while those who were eligible under the residence requirement or by virtue of statelessness become citizens of the municipality where they were last resident.

Foreigners not eligible for facilitated naturalisation become qualified to apply through the standard procedure after 10 years of residence. Applicants must petition a local municipality to grant them local citizenship rights through a public ballot. Candidates who actively participate in community life are more likely to be accepted, though this is not guaranteed. Local residents are unlikely to vote in favour of granting citizenship to anyone not resident for at least 30 years and the process cannot be appealed if the electorate does not approve an applicant. In 2012, 119 people were naturalised but only a single person acquired citizenship by popular vote.

Between 1988 and 2006, only 170 people naturalised by popular vote while 921 successfully completed the facilitated process between 2000 and 2006. For foreign residents with non-German language backgrounds, the municipal vote represents a significant barrier to citizenship as they are less involved in public life. A total of 4 Italian and 5 Turkish citizens gained approval for naturalisation by the electorate for the entire period from 1988 to 2006 compared to 56 Italian and 111 Turkish citizens who naturalised using the facilitated process between 2000 and 2006. Since 2008, all applicants for both facilitated and standard naturalisation processes are required to renounce all previous nationalities and demonstrate sufficient knowledge of the German language (at least at the B1 level in the Common European Framework of Reference for Languages).

=== Relinquishment and deprivation ===
Liechtensteiner citizenship can be relinquished by making a declaration of renunciation, provided that the declarant already possesses or intends to acquire another nationality. Minor children of a person who gave up citizenship also cease to be citizens. Naturalised citizens may be stripped of their citizenship within five years of having acquired it if they have been found to not have actually met the naturalisation requirements. Citizenship may be deprived at any time from a person who fraudulently acquired it.

== See also ==
- Visa policy of the Schengen Area
- Visa requirements for Liechtenstein citizens
