= Passports of the EFTA member states =

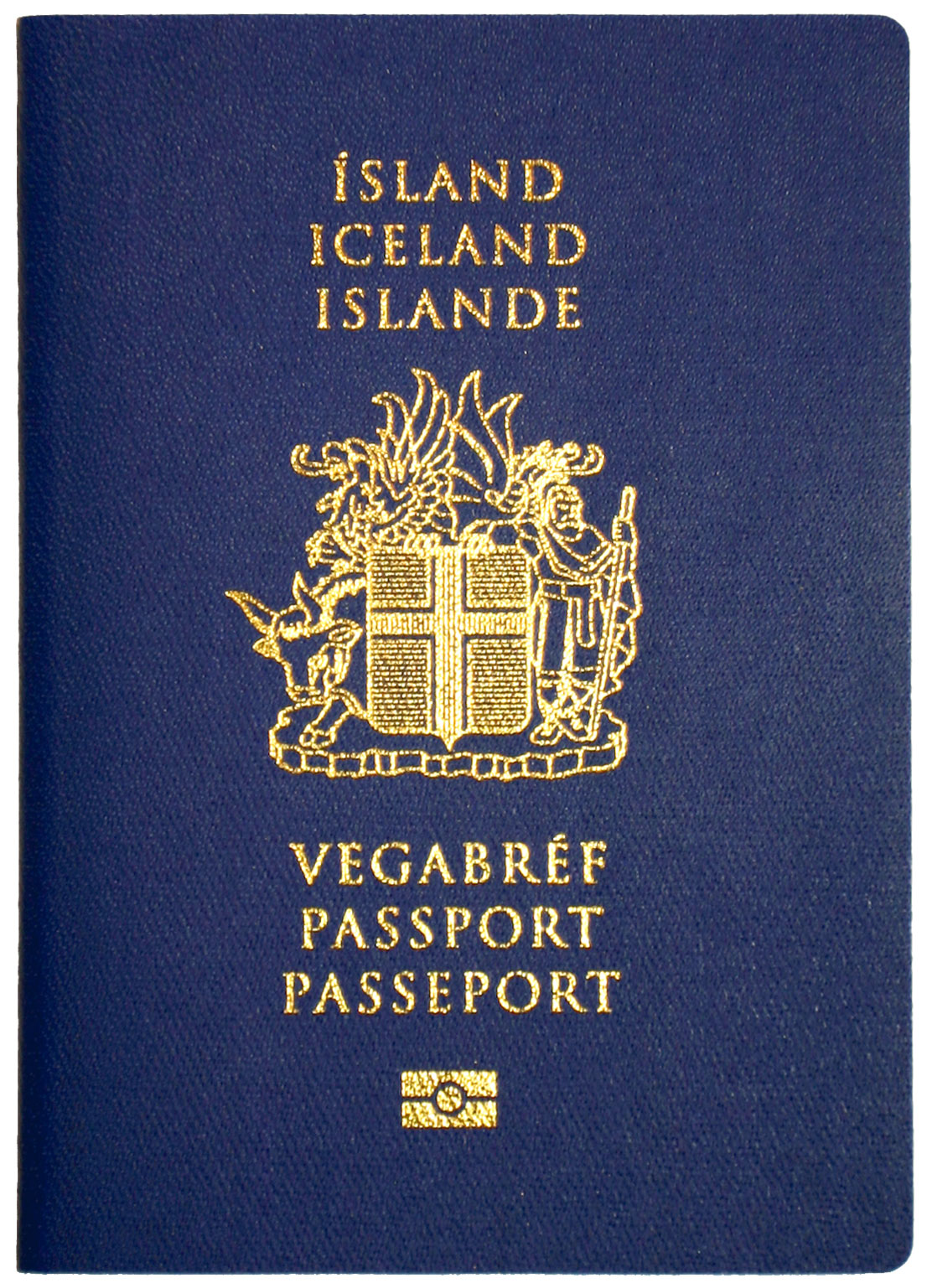
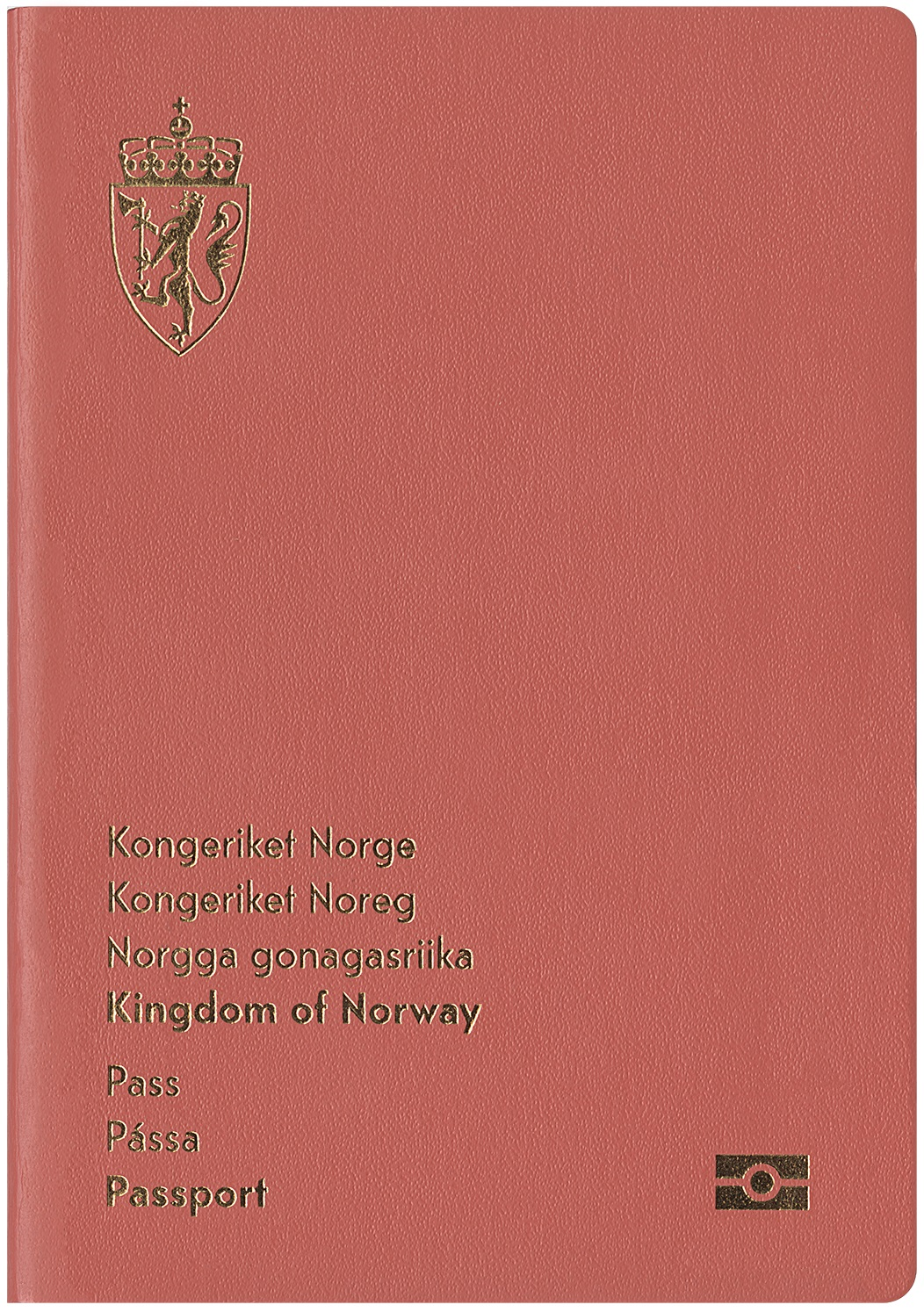
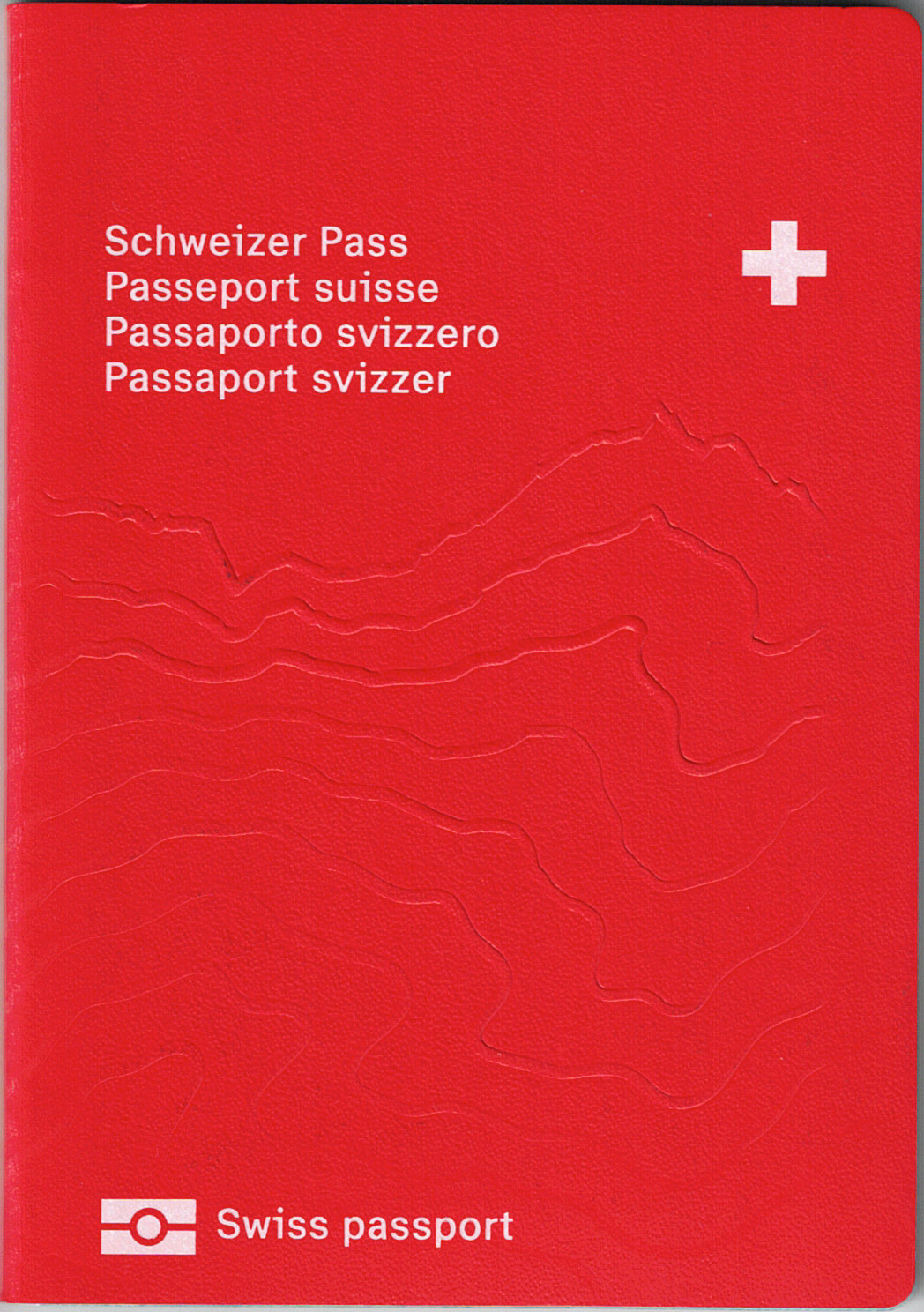
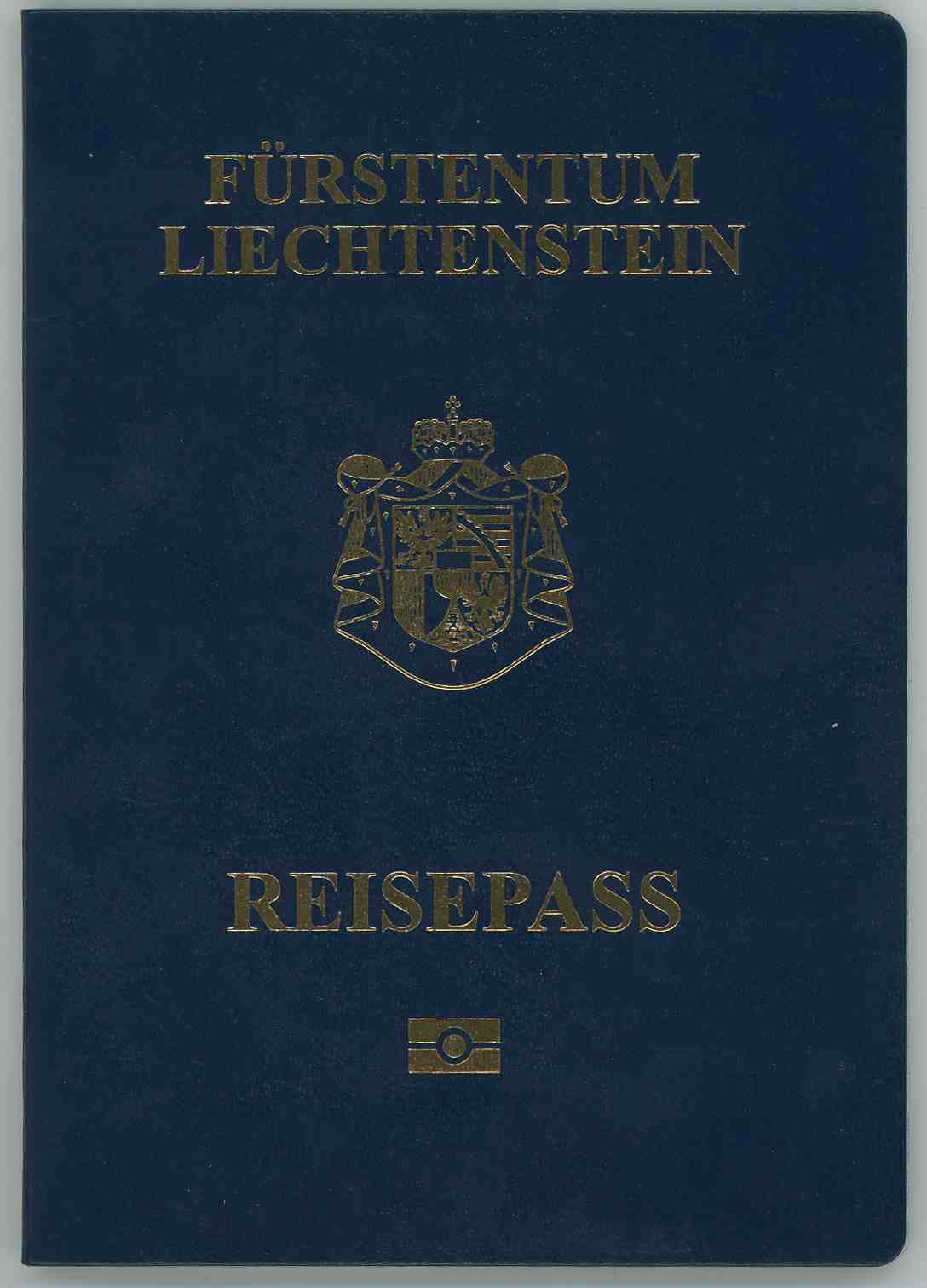
Biometric passports of the four EFTA member states

EFTA and EU EFTA member states EU member states

Passports of the EFTA member states are passports issued by the European Free Trade Association (EFTA) member states Iceland, Liechtenstein, Norway and Switzerland. EFTA is in this article used as a common name for these countries.

EFTA as an organisation does issue rules for passport design and validity of the four countries, but the European Union does this through the Schengen regulations, besides the global ICAO regulations. The EFTA member states are bound by the Schengen regulations as they are part of the Schengen Area.

== Use ==
Passports issued by the EFTA member states can be used by citizens to exercise the right of free movement within EFTA and the European Economic Area (EEA), which consists of Iceland, Liechtenstein and Norway in addition to the member states of the European Union.

Instead of being part of the EEA, Switzerland has a series of bilateral agreements with the EU. The European Single Market consequently has been extended, with exceptions, to all EFTA member states. The EFTA member states are also signatories of the Schengen Agreement and part of the Schengen Area. Citizens of the EFTA member states generally have the same rights as EU citizens in EEA countries and are treated as EU citizens for the purposes of travel and entry into EEA countries.

When going through border controls to enter an EFTA or EEA member state, EFTA and EU/EEA citizens possessing valid biometric passports are sometimes able to use automated gates instead of immigration counters, whilst all other citizens (such as those using a national identity card or a non-biometric passport) and non-EEA citizens must use an immigration counter. Anyone travelling with children must also use an immigration counter.

== Characteristics ==
Passport standards are issued by the International Civil Aviation Organization (ICAO) which are treated as recommendations to national governments. All EFTA member states except Liechtenstein are ICAO members, but Liechtenstein has delegated Switzerland to implement the treaty to make it applicable in the territory of Liechtenstein.

ICAO has published standards for machine-readable passports contained in Document 9303 Machine Readable Travel Documents and a more recent standard covering biometric passports. All EFTA countries issues biometric passports.

- The size of passport booklets shall be 125 mm × 88 mm (4.9 in × 3.5 in), as specified in ISO/IEC 7810 ID-3 standard.
- The data page follows a standardized layout, divided into seven zones which contain mandatory elements in a standard sequence. Zones I to VI forms the Visual Inspection Zone (VIZ), and Zone VII is the Machine Readable Zone (MRZ).
- All fields for mandatory data elements in the VIZ shall have captions which may be in the official language of the issuing State. If that language is not English, French or Spanish, it shall be followed by an oblique character (/) and the equivalent of the caption in English, French or Spanish. If the official language is English, French or Spanish is shall be followed by one of the other two languages.
- Latin-alphabet characters (i.e. A to Z) and Arabic numerals (i.e. 1234567890) shall be used in the VIZ with diacritics permitted.

Schengen member states shall issue passports and travel documents that comply with minimum security standards. This is according to Council Regulation (EC) 2252/2004 and 444/2009 which the EFTA countries are bound by, as it constitutes a development of provisions of the Schengen acquis within the meaning of the Agreement concluded by the Council of the European Union and Iceland and Norway, the agreement concluded by the European Union, the European Community and the Swiss Confederation, and the Protocol signed between the European Union, the European Community, the Swiss Confederation and the Principality of Liechtenstein on the accession of the Principality of Liechtenstein to the Agreement between the European Union, the European Community and the Swiss Confederation, concerning the association of the four States with the implementation, application and development of the Schengen acquis.

- Passports and travel documents issued by Member States shall comply with the minimum security standards set out in the Annex of the regulation.
- Passports must incorporate a storage medium (a chip) that contains the holder's facial image and fingerprints. This obligation does not apply to identity cards or to temporary passports and travel documents with a validity of one year or less.

In addition to harmonization of security features and biometrics, member states of the European Union have started to harmonise aspects of the designs of their ordinary passports. Most passports issued by EU member states have the common recommended lay out; burgundy in colour with the words “European Union” followed by the name(s) of the country, the emblem of the state and the word "Passport".

Of the EFTA member states, only Iceland and Liechtenstein follows the same order as on EU passports, but with a blue cover. Swiss and Norwegian passports have a brighter red cover. The Swiss passport with the word "Swiss passports" in German, French, Italian, Romansh and English above the Swiss equilateral white cross, and the Norwegian passport sports the coat of arms of Norway emblazoned in the top left of the front cover, above the words "Kingdom of Norway" and "Passport" in Bokmål, Nynorsk, Sami and English.

=== Machine-readable zone ===
Passports and travel document shall contain a machine-readable biographical data page, which shall comply with Part 1 (machine-readable passports) of ICAO Document 9303 and the way they are issued shall comply with the specifications for machine-readable passports set out therein. Newer EFTA passports contain a Machine-readable zone, which contains the name, nationality and most other information from the identification page. It is designed in a way so that computers can fairly easily read the information, although it still human readable, since it contains only letters (A–Z), digits and "<" as space character, but no bar graph or similar. Apostrophes and similar have to be omitted, but hyphens and spaces should be replaced by an angle bracket. Diacritical marks are not permitted in the MRZ. Even though they may be useful to distinguish names, the use of diacritical marks in the MRZ could confuse machine-reading equipment.

=== Personal name spelling differences ===
Names containing non-English letters are usually spelled in the correct way in the visual (non-machine-readable) zone of the passport, but are mapped into A-Z according to the standards of the International Civil Aviation Organization (ICAO) in the machine-readable zone.

The following mapping is specified for languages of the EFTA countries: å → AA or A, æ → AE, ä → AE or A, ð → D, ø → OE, ö → OE or O, ß → SS, þ → TH and ü → UE. Letters with accents are otherwise replaced by simple letters (François becomes FRANCOIS etc.).

For example, the Norwegian names Sætre becomes SAETRE, Møller becomes MOELLER, and Nygård becomes NYGAARD (or NYGARD). The ICAO mapping is mostly used for computer-generated and internationally used documents such as air tickets, but sometimes (like in US visas) also simple letters are used (MOLLER, NYGARD).

The three possible spelling variants of the same name (e.g. Nygård / Nygaard / Nygard) in different documents sometimes lead to confusion, and the use of two different spellings within the same document (like in the Norwegian passports) may give people who are unfamiliar with the foreign orthography the impression that the document is a forgery.

It is recommended to use the spelling used in the machine-readable passport zone for visas, airline tickets, etc., and to refer to that zone if being questioned. The same thing applies if the name is too long to fit in the airline's ticket system, otherwise problems can arise. (The machine-readable has room for 39 letters for the name while the visual zone can contain as many as will fit)

=== Iceland ===
Icelandic passports are blue, with the Icelandic coat of arms emblazoned in the centre of the front cover. The words "ÍSLAND" (Icelandic), "ICELAND" (English) and "ISLANDE" (French) are inscribed above the coat of arms and the words "VEGABRÉF" (Icelandic), "PASSPORT" (English) and "PASSEPORT" (French) are inscribed below the coat of arms. Icelandic passports have the standard biometric symbol at the bottom.

Vegabréf literally means "road letter" and is a word used in Scandinavia in historic centuries meaning internal passport.

Identity Information Page

The Icelandic passport includes the following data:

- Photo of Passport Holder
- Type (PA)
- Code (ISL)
- Passport No.
- Surname
- Given Names
- Nationality
- Height
- Date of Birth
- Personal code number
- Sex
- Place of Birth
- Date of Issue
- Date of Expiry
- Authority

The information page ends with the Machine Readable Zone.

=== Liechtenstein ===
Liechtenstein passports are blue with the coat of arms of Liechtenstein emblazoned in the centre. The words "FÜRSTENTUM LIECHTENSTEIN" are inscribed above the coat of arms, with "REISEPASS" and the international biometric passport symbol below.

The information page ends with the Machine Readable Zone.

=== Norway ===
Current regular Norwegian passports are red in colour, with the coat of arms of Norway emblazoned in the top left of the front cover. The words "Kongeriket Norge", "Kongeriket Noreg", "Norgga gonagasriika" and "Kingdom of Norway" ("Kingdom of Norway" in Bokmål and Nynorsk (the two forms of Norwegian), Sámi and English respectively) are inscribed in the bottom left corner and the word "Pass", "Pássa" and "Passport" emblazoned below the name of the country. In the bottom right corner is the standard biometric symbol.

Identity information page

The Norwegian passport includes the following data:

- Photo of passport holder
- Type (a two-letter code beginning with "P")
- Code of Issuing State (NOR)
- Passport No.
- Surname
- Given Names
- Nationality (NORSK/ NORWEGIAN)
- Date of birth
- Date of issue
- Date of expiry
- Issuing authority (The police district)
- Sex
- Height
- Place of birth (Three letter country code, NOR for those born in Norway)
- CAN (six digit number)

The holder's signature and Personal No. was included on the information page on the previous passport version but was moved in the current version.

The information page ends with the machine-readable zone starting with "P<NOR", the previous version started with "PxNOR, where x indicated the type of passport. For example, ordinary passports contained "PVNOR", where the "V" presumably means "vanlig" ("ordinary" in Norwegian.)

=== Switzerland ===
Swiss passports are red in colour, with the words Schweizer Pass (German), Passeport suisse (French), Passaporto svizzero (Italian), and Passaport svizzer (Romansh) in the top left corner, with the Swiss equilateral white cross to the right. The standard biometric symbol is placed on the bottom left hand side, with Swiss passport (English) next to it. The font and icons are in white.

Identity information page

A Swiss passport includes the following data on the full plastic information page

- (left) Photo of the passport bearer
- Type of Passport (PA - without biometrics, PM - with biometrics, PD - temporary passport, PB - diplomatic passport)
- Code (CHE)
- Passport No.
- 1 Surname
- 2 Given Name(s)
- 3 Nationality
- 4 Date of Birth (dd.mm.yyyy)
- 5 Sex (M/F)
- 6 Height in (cm)
- 7 Place of origin: (municipality and canton) (NB. place of birth is not indicated in Swiss identity documents issued to citizens)
- 8 Date of Issue
- 9 Authority
- 10 Date of Expiry (note: Swiss Passports can no longer be extended after the date of the expiry.)
- Passport Type:
  - PM - Normal biometric passport containing 1 digital photo and 2 digital finger prints
  - PB - Service, Diplomatic or Partner
  - PD - Temporary or Emergency (generally for return travels only)

The information page ends with the Machine Readable Zone.

== Overview of passports ==
Member state	Passport cover	Biodata page	Cost	Validity	Issuing authority	Latest version
Iceland			ISK 13000 kr (adults aged 18–66); ISK 5600 (children, elderly and disabled); ISK 26000 (express processing, adults aged 18–66); ISK 11.000 (express processing, children, elderly and disabled)	10 years (adults)	Registers Iceland (Þjóðskrá Íslands)	23 May 2006 (biometric) 1 February 2019 (current version)
Liechtenstein			CHF 250 (adults); CHF 100 (children aged 12–18); CHF 50 (minors under 12); CHF 375 (express processing, adults); CHF 100 (express processing, children aged 12–18); CHF 75 (express processing, minors under 12)	10 years adults and children over 12; 5 years minors under 12	Ausländer- und Passamt	26 October 2006
Norway			NOK 840 (adults and children aged 16 or older); NOK 510 (children under 16)	2 years (aged 0–4); 3 years (aged 5–9); 5 years (aged 10–15); 10 years (aged 16 and older)	In Norway: Norwegian Police Service (local police district) Abroad: Ministry of Foreign Affairs (embassies or consulates)	20 January 2026
Switzerland			CHF 145 (adults); CHF 65 (children)	10 years (aged 18 or over); 5 years (aged 0–17)	Canton passport office (Federal Office of Police)	31 October 2022

== Multiple simultaneous passports ==
=== Same country ===
Norway allows their citizens to have more than one passport at once to circumvent certain travel restrictions. This can be useful if wanting to travel while a passport remains at a consulate while a visa application is processed, or wanting to apply for further visas while already in a foreign country. It can also be needed to circumvent the fact that visitors whose passports show evidence of a visit to Israel are not allowed to enter Iran, Iraq, Lebanon, Libya, Saudi Arabia, the Sudan, Syria and Yemen (It is, however, possible to get the Israeli entry and exit stamp on a separate piece of paper).

=== Multiple citizenship ===
Since each EFTA member state can make its own citizenship laws, dual citizenship is not always possible. Of the EFTA countries, Iceland and Norway allows dual or multiple citizenship without any restrictions, Switzerland regulate/restrict it (the conditions for the naturalization of immigrants vary regionally), and Liechtenstein only allows it for citizens by descent, but not for foreigners wanting to naturalize.

A citizen of an EFTA member state can live and work in all other EFTA- or EU member states (but not necessarily vote or work in sensitive fields, such as government, police, military where citizenship is often required). Non-citizens may not have the same rights to welfare and unemployment benefits as citizens.

== Visa requirements ==
Visa requirements are administrative entry restrictions by the authorities of other states placed on citizens of the European Free Trade Association (EFTA) member states.

=== Freedom of movement within EFTA and the EU/EEA ===
EFTA member states' citizens enjoy freedom of movement in each other's territories in accordance with the EFTA convention. EFTA nationals also enjoy freedom of movement in the European Union (EU). EFTA nationals and EU citizens and are not only visa-exempt but are legally entitled to enter and reside in each other's countries. The Citizens’ Rights Directive (also sometimes called the "Free Movement Directive") defines the right of free movement for citizens of the European Economic Area (EEA), which includes the three EFTA members Iceland, Norway and Liechtenstein and the member states of the EU. Switzerland, which is a member of EFTA but not of the EEA, is not bound by the Directive but rather has a separate bilateral agreement on free movement with the EU.

As a result, de facto, a citizen of an EFTA country can live and work in all the other EFTA countries and in all the EU countries, and a citizen of an EU country can live and work in all the EFTA countries (but for voting and working in sensitive fields, such as government / police / military, citizenship is often required, and non-citizens may not have the same rights to welfare and unemployment benefits as citizens).

All EFTA member states are part of the Schengen Area, an area comprising 26 European states that have officially abolished passport and all other types of border control at their mutual borders. The area mostly functions as a single country for international travel purposes, with a common visa policy. The area is named after the Schengen Agreement. Since the implementation of the Schengen rules, border posts have been closed (and often entirely removed) between participating countries; that and the pro forma borders are the subject of a photo-journalistic art project. The Schengen Borders Code requires participating states to remove all obstacles to free traffic flow at internal borders. Thus, road, rail and air passengers no longer have their identity checked by border guards when travelling between Schengen countries, although security controls by carriers are still permissible. Travellers should still bring a passport or national identity card, as one may be required. As an alternative to holding a passport, a valid national identity card can also be used to exercise the right of free movement within the EEA and Switzerland. Strictly speaking, it is not necessary for an EEA or Swiss citizen to possess a valid passport or national identity card to enter the EEA or Switzerland. In theory, if an EEA or Swiss citizen outside of both the EEA and Switzerland can prove his/her nationality by any other means (e.g. by presenting an expired passport or national identity card, or a citizenship certificate), he/she must be permitted to enter the EEA or Switzerland. An EEA or Swiss citizen who is unable to demonstrate his/her nationality satisfactorily must nonetheless be given 'every reasonable opportunity' to obtain the necessary documents or to have them delivered within a reasonable period of time.

States in the Schengen Area have strengthened border controls with non-Schengen countries. Participating countries are required to apply strict checks on travellers entering and exiting the Schengen Area. These checks are co-ordinated by the European Union's Frontex agency, and subject to common rules. The details of border controls, surveillance and the conditions under which permission to enter into the Schengen Area may be granted are exhaustively detailed in the Schengen Borders Code.

=== Other countries ===
As part of the Schengen Area, reciprocity is required when it comes to visa free access. Since 2001, the European Union has issued two lists regarding visas for the Schengen Area: a white list of countries whose nationals do not require visas (Annex II) and a black list of countries whose nationals do require visas (Annex I). As per Regulation No 539/2001 (amended by Regulation No 1289/2013) reciprocity is required from all Annex II countries and territories. That means that these countries must offer visa-free access for 90 days to citizens of the 26 Schengen member states.

=== Passport rankings ===
Passport rankings by the number of countries and territories their holders could visit without a visa or by obtaining visa on arrival were as follows as of 18 July 2025 (Henley Passport Index):

Country	Number of destinations
Iceland	182
Liechtenstein	181
Norway	188
Switzerland	187

== Other EEA passports ==
Like passports issued by the EFTA member states, passports of the EU member states can be used to exercise the right of free movement within the European Economic Area and Switzerland.

The European Union itself does not issue ordinary passports, but ordinary passport booklets issued by its 27 member states share a common format. This common format features a coloured cover (for which burgundy is recommended but not compulsory: all countries except Croatia follow this recommendation) emblazoned—in the official language(s) of the issuing country (and sometimes its translation into English and French)—with the title "European Union", followed by the name(s) of the member state, its coat of arms, the word "PASSPORT", together with the biometric passport symbol at the bottom centre of the front cover. The common design features are a result of several non-binding resolutions and the security characteristics in EU passports are regulated through both non-binding resolutions and binding regulations.

As part of the Schengen agreement, passports and travel documents issued by member states shall comply with minimum security standards, and passports must incorporate a storage medium (a chip) that contains the holder's facial image and fingerprints. This obligation does not apply to identity cards or to temporary passports and travel documents with a validity of one year or less. Ireland is not (and the UK wasn't) bound by the rules as they are not part of the Schengen area, and Regulation (EC) No 2252/2004 constitutes a development of provisions of the Schengen acquis.

== See also ==
- European Economic Area
- National identity cards in the European Economic Area
- Visa policy of the Schengen Area
