= Driver's license =

Document allowing one to drive a motorized vehicle

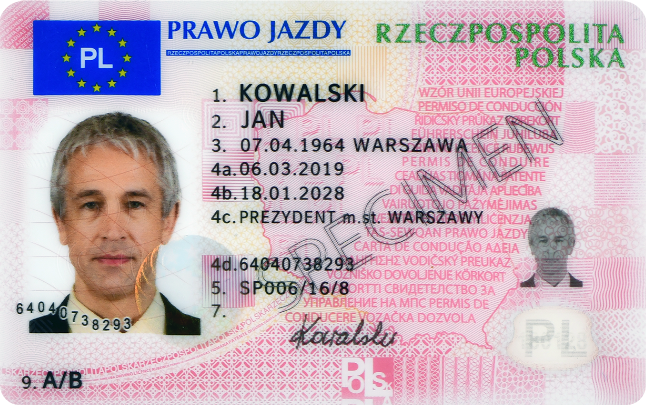
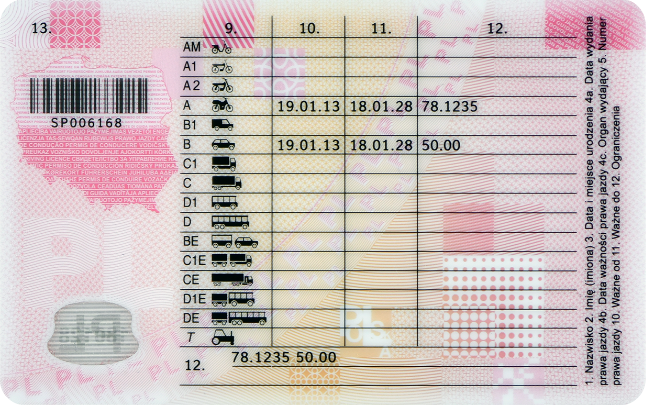
A Polish driving permit in the format of the standardized European driving licence style

A driver's license, driver license, driving licence, or driving permit is a legal authorization, or a document confirming such an authorization, for a specific individual to operate one or more types of motorized vehicles—such as motorcycles, cars, trucks, or buses—on a public road. Such licenses are often plastic and the size of a credit card, and frequently used as an identity card.

In most international agreements, the wording "driving permit" is used, for instance in the Vienna Convention on Road Traffic. Different regions use variations of the terms driver/driver's/driving permit/license/licence – see sections below for the term used in each region.

The laws relating to the licensing of drivers vary between jurisdictions. In some jurisdictions, a permit is issued after the recipient has passed a driving test, while in others a person acquires their permit, or a learner's permit, before beginning to drive. Different categories of permit often exist for different types of motor vehicles, particularly large trucks and passenger vehicles. The difficulty of the driving test varies considerably between jurisdictions, as do factors such as age and the required level of competence and practice.

== History ==
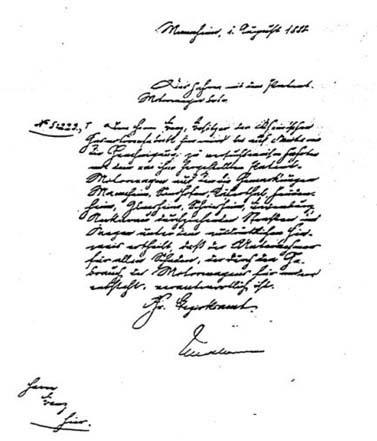
The world's first permit to drive a motor vehicle, issued to Carl Benz upon his request

Carl Benz, inventor of the modern car, received a written "Genehmigung" (permit) from the Grand Ducal authorities to operate his car on public roads in 1888 after residents complained about the noise and smell of his Motorwagen. Up until the start of the 20th century, European authorities issued similar permits to drive motor vehicles ad hoc, if at all.

Mandatory licensing for drivers in the United Kingdom came into force on 1 January 1904 after the Motor Car Act 1903 received royal assent. Every car owner had to register their vehicle with their local government authority and be able to prove registration of their vehicle on request. The minimum qualifying age was set at 17. The "driving licence" gave its holder 'freedom of the road' with a maximum 20 mph (32 km/h) speed limit. Compulsory testing was introduced in 1934, with the passing of the Road Traffic Act.

Prussia, then a kingdom within the German Empire, introduced compulsory licensing on 29 September 1903. A test on mechanical aptitude had to be passed and the Dampfkesselüberwachungsverein ("steam boiler supervision association") was charged with conducting these tests. In 1910, the German imperial government mandated the licensing of drivers on a national scale, establishing a system of tests and driver's education requirements that was adopted in other countries.

Other countries in Europe also introduced driving tests during the twentieth century, the last of them being Belgium where, until as recently as 1977, it was possible to purchase and hold a permit without having to undergo a driving test.

As traffic-related fatalities soared in North America, public outcry provoked legislators to begin studying the French and German statutes as models. On 1 August 1910, North America's first licensing law for motor vehicles went into effect in the U.S. state of New York, though it initially applied only to professional chauffeurs. In July 1913, the state of New Jersey became the first to require all drivers to pass a mandatory examination before being licensed.

In 1909, the Convention with Respect to the International Circulation of Motor Vehicles recognized the need for qualifications, examination, and authorization for international driving.

The notion of an "International Driving Permit" was first mooted in an international convention held in Paris in 1926.

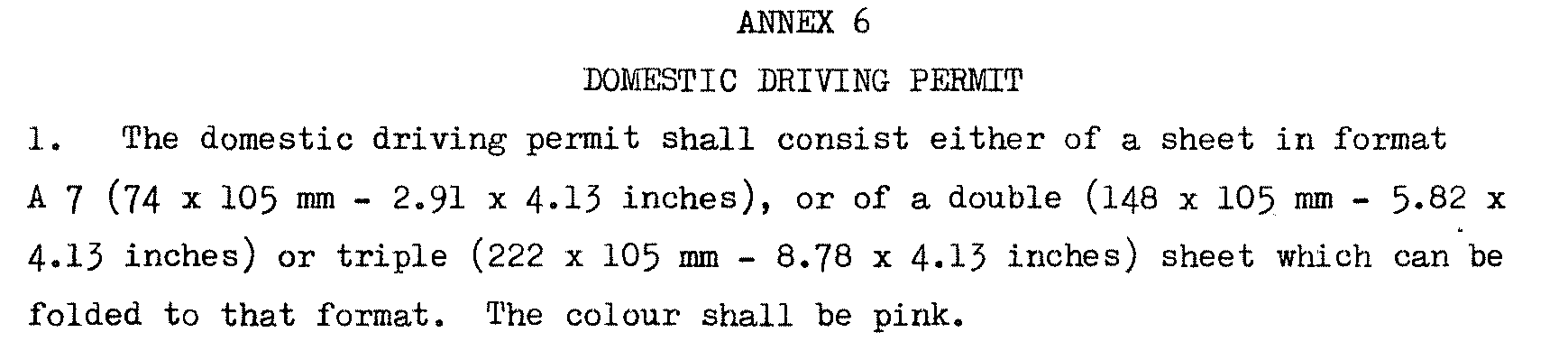
Screenshot of Annex 6 of the "Convention on Road Traffic" volume 125 of Geneva convention 1949

In 1949, the United Nations hosted the Geneva Convention on Road Traffic that standardised rules on roads, occupants, rules, signs, driver's permits and such. It specified that national "driving permits" should be pink and that an "International Driving Permit" for driving in a number of countries should have grey covers with white pages and that "The entire last page shall be drawn up in French".

In 1968, the Vienna Convention on Road Traffic, ratified in 1977 and further updated in 2011, further modernised these agreements.

Its main regulations about drivers permits are in Annex 6 (Domestic Driving Permit) and Annex 7 (International Driving Permit). The currently active version of those is in force in each contracting party no later than "29 March 2011" (Article 43).

Article 41 of the convention describes key requirements:

- every driver of a motor vehicle must hold appropriate documentation;
- "driving permits" can be issued only after passing theoretical and practical exams, which are regulated by each country or jurisdiction;
- Contracting parties shall recognize as valid for driving in their territories:
- "domestic driving permits" conforming to the provisions of Annex 6 to the convention;
- an "International Driving Permit" conforming to the provisions of Annex 7 to the convention, on condition that it is presented with the corresponding domestic driving permit;
- "domestic driving permits" issued by a contracting party shall be recognised in the territory of another contracting party until this territory becomes the place of normal residence of their holder;
- all of the above does not apply to learner-driver permits;
- the period of validity of an international driving permit shall be either no more than three years after the date of issue or until the date of expiry of the domestic driving permit, whichever is earlier;
- Contracting parties may refuse to recognize the validity of driving permits for persons under eighteen or, for categories C, D, CE and DE, under twenty-one;
- an international driving permit shall only be issued by the contracting party in whose territory the holder has their normal residence and that issued the domestic driving permit or that recognized the driving permit issued by another contracting party; it shall not be valid for use in that territory.

In 2018, ISO/IEC standard 18013 was published which established guidelines for the design format and data content of an ISO-compliant driving licence (IDL). The design approach is to establish a secure domestic driving permit (DDP) and accompanying booklet for international use, instead of the international driving permit (IDP) paper document. The main ideology is a minimum acceptable set of requirements with regards to content and layout of the data elements, with sufficient freedom afforded to the issuing authorities of driving licences to meet domestic needs. The ISO standard specifies requirements for a card that is aligned with the UN Conventions on Road Traffic. This standard however has no official mandate or recognition from the WP.1 of UNECE as a replacement for the current IDP standards as described in the 1949 and 1968 Conventions.

The specifications of the layout of the booklet is defined in Annex G of ISO/IEC 18013-1:2018. There are two options; a booklet with some personalisation or a booklet with no personalisation. The booklet shall be marginally larger than an ID-1 size card, with an insert pocket for storage of the card, and for convenient carrying of the booklet. The front cover should include the logo of the UN or the issuing country and the words "Translation of Driving Licence" and "Traduction du Permis de Conduire ".

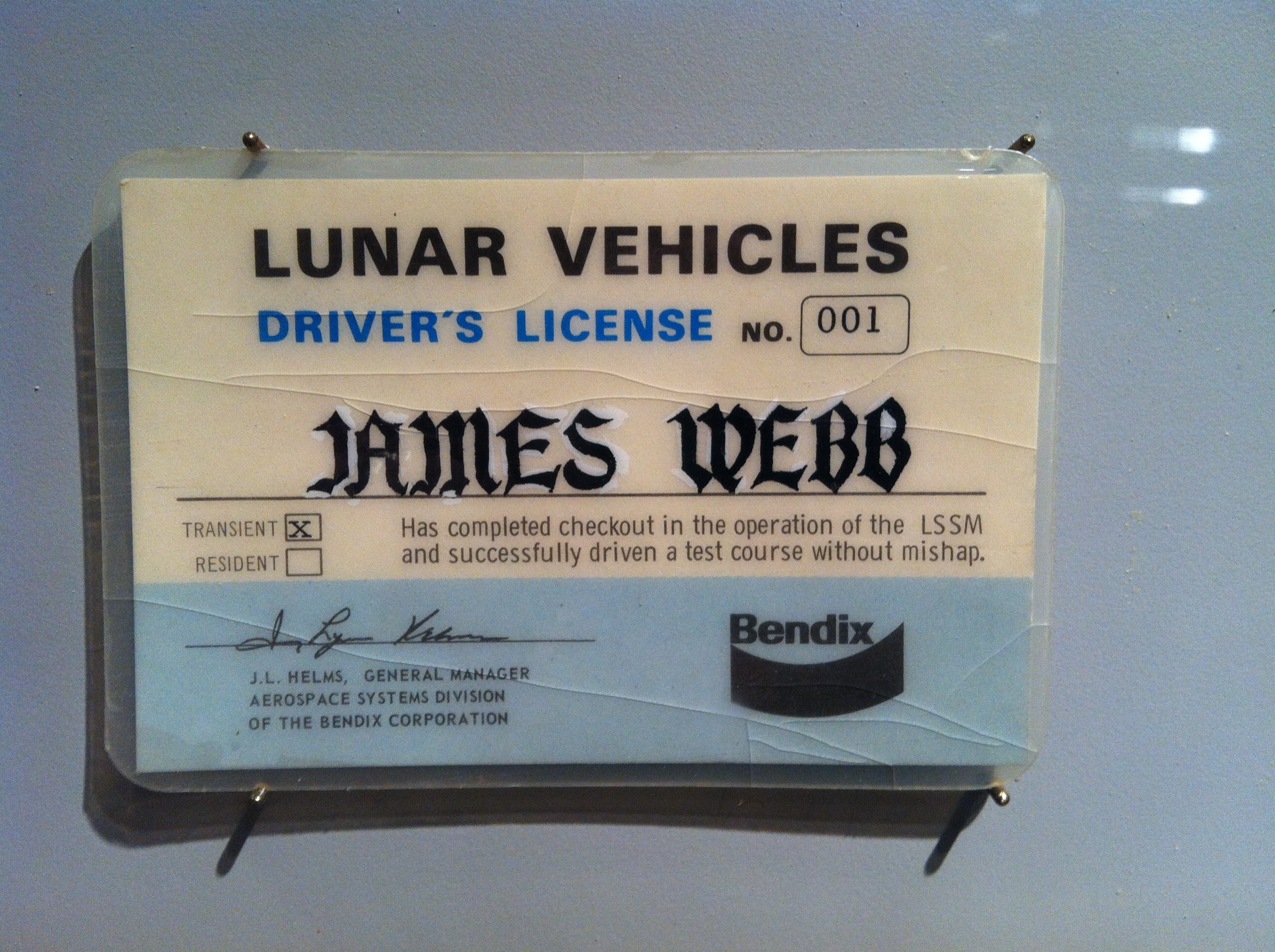
A driver's license for the moon presented to then NASA Administrator James E. Webb

== Use for identification purposes ==
Many countries, including Australia, New Zealand, Canada, the United Kingdom, and the United States, have no national identification cards. Since many people do have driving permits, they are often accepted as proof of identity. In some territories, non-drivers can apply for identification-only cards with a similar format to a driving permit. Most identity cards and driving permits are credit card size—the "ID-1" size and shape defined in ISO/IEC 7810.

=== Asia ===
A Hong Kong Driving Licence carries the same number as the holder's ID card, but has no photograph. As such, it is not a legal document for proof of age for purchase of alcohol. Upon control, both must be presented. Plans to make the newly phased in Smart ID contain driver licensing information have been shelved.

Similarly, the Saudi Arabian government require all drivers to carry an ID card in addition to a driving permit and present them whenever requested. In Saudi Arabia using a permit instead is only permitted if the request is made for on-site inspection/identification purposes, especially at checkpoints. Expatriates may be requested to present their visas as well.

In India, Japan, South Korea, and Singapore, driving permit cards are widely used as identification.

=== Europe ===
Many European countries require drivers to produce their permit on demand when driving. Some European countries require adults to carry proof of identity at all times, but a driving permit is not valid for identification in every European country.

In the United Kingdom, most drivers are not required to carry their Driving Licence. A driver may be required by a constable or vehicle examiner to produce this, but may provide it at a specified police station within seven days; the police issue a form for this purpose.

In Denmark, Finland, Iceland, Norway, Spain and Sweden, the driving permit number is listed along with the bearer's national identification number. Banks and public authorities use the same number for customer databases, making the permit fully useful for identification purposes.

=== North America ===
In Canada, Mexico, and the United States, driving permits are issued by the provinces/states and territories, and do not look the same nationwide. They are also used as a de facto or government-issued identification document for the holder (so much so that the United States enacted the Real ID Act of 2005 for standardization).

The American Association of Motor Vehicle Administrators provides a standard for the design of driving permits and identification cards issued by AAMVA member jurisdictions, which include all 50 U.S. states and District of Columbia, and all Canadian territories and provinces. The newest card design standard released is the 2020 AAMVA DL/ID Card Design Standard (CDS). The AAMVA standard generally follows part 1 and part 2 of ISO/IEC 18013-1 (ISO compliant driving license). The ISO standard in turn specifies requirements for a card that is aligned with the UN Conventions on Road Traffic, namely the Geneva Convention on Road Traffic and the Vienna Convention on Road Traffic.

Most government issuers of driving permits also issue identification cards with similar attributes to those jurisdictional residents who do not have or maintain a valid driving permit, making it easier for them to do things such as open a bank account and perform any other activities that require official identification. Identification cards serve as government-issued photo ID but do not enable a person to operate a motor vehicle, a fact typically noted on the ID via the phrase 'Not a driver's licence' or similar wording. This type of photo ID is referred to as a Photo Card in some jurisdictions (for example, the Ontario Photo Card).

In Canada and the United States, the abbreviation DLN is commonly used for a driver's license number. Five states in the northern United States (Michigan, Minnesota, New York, Vermont and Washington) and the Canadian province of Manitoba also offer an "enhanced driver's license" (EDL), which is a driving permit that has an embedded RFID chip and is accepted at the federal level in lieu of a passport for land and sea (but not air) border crossings between the US and Canada. The EDL program was also previously offered in British Columbia, Ontario and Quebec, but is no longer offered there.

==== Dominican Republic ====
In the Dominican Republic, the driving permit number is the same as the citizen's ID number.

=== South America ===
In Venezuela, the driving permit number is the same as the citizen's ID number.

== Permits for different categories of vehicles ==
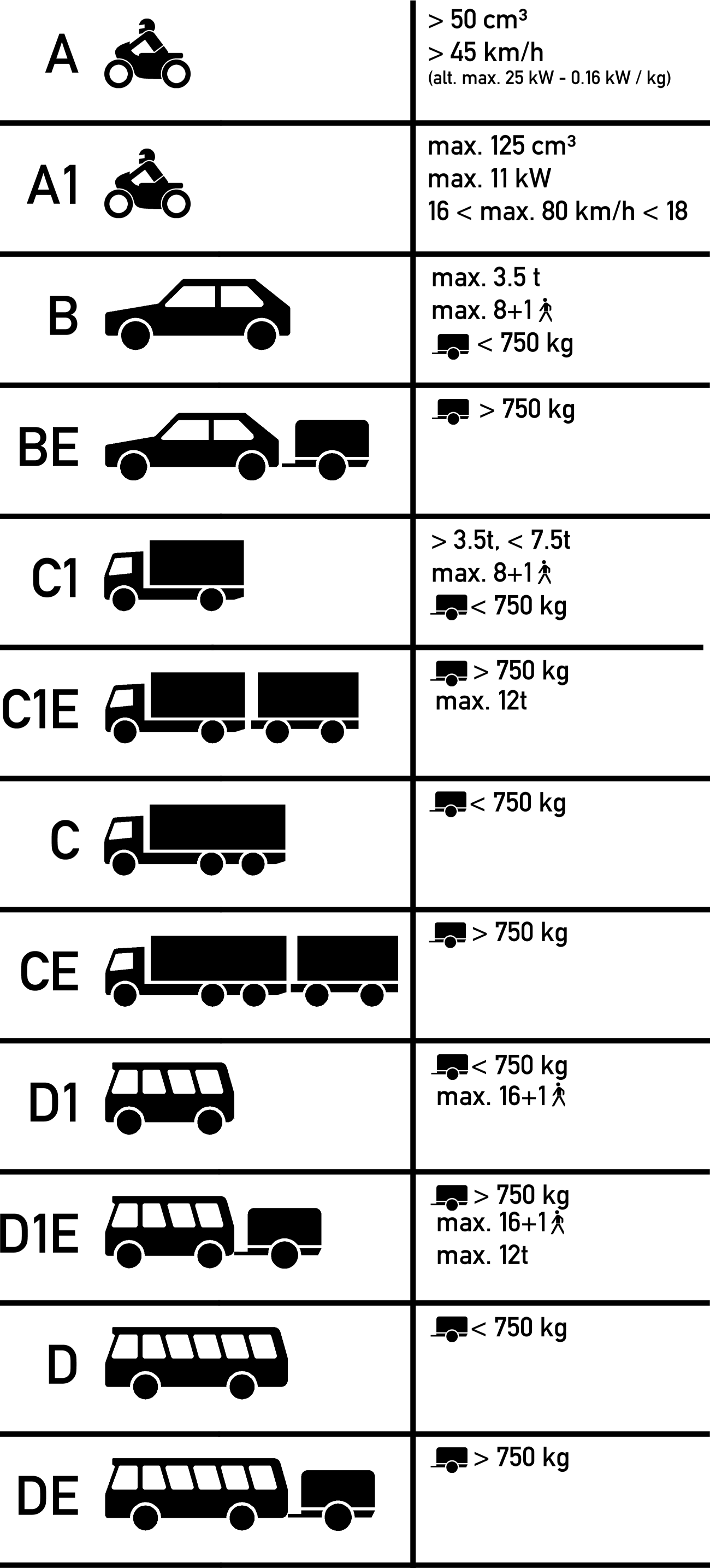
Driving permits in Europe are divided into categories.

In the United States, New Zealand, Australia, the UK, the European Union and sometimes Canada, people who drive commercially are required to have permits. The cost of taking the tests and examinations usually means that an employer will subsidize their drivers.

=== Africa ===
==== Egypt ====
Egyptian citizens are entitled to a driver's licence once they have reached the age of 18. To obtain their licence, applicants must pass a driving test as well as several computer tests. To pass, all a person had to do was drive six metres forward then reverse six metres. The test was updated to make it more difficult; now the applicant has to get 8 out of 10 answers correct in a computer test, then pass a forward and reverse S-track test in addition to an assessment of parking skills.

==== Ghana ====
Driver's licensing in Ghana is conducted by the nation's Driver and Vehicle Licensing Authority. The legal driving age is 18.

==== Kenya ====
The legal driving age is 18 years old. The permit must include:

- Id number
- Name
- Date of issue
- Class of vehicle

==== Morocco ====
Driver licensing in Morocco is conducted by the Ministry of Equipment, Transport and Logistics (Morocco). The minimum driving age of Moroccan citizens is 18.

==== Nigeria ====
In Nigeria, the minimum age to qualify for a drivers licence is 18. The applicant would first attend training at an accredited driving school. Then, the driving school will present the applicant to a Vehicle Inspection Officer (VIO) for a driving test. Upon passing the driving test the applicant would obtain a certificate of proficiency from the VIO. The applicant then completes a drivers license application form at the Drivers Licence Centre (DLC) or downloads the form online. Afterwards the applicant pays a licence fee online or at the Bank and presents their application form to the Board of Internal Revenue (BIR) Officer and VIO at the DLC for endorsement. After all these procedures the applicant goes to the Federal Road Safety Corps (FRSC) Officer at the DLC for biometric data capture, and is given a temporary drivers licence which is valid for 60 days. The applicant picks up the original drivers licence at the BIR Office after 60 days.

==== South Africa ====
The minimum driving age in South Africa is 17, when drivers may drive with an adult who holds a valid driving licence, after passing a learner's theory test. At 18, a driving licence can be obtained after passing the road test. Small motorcycles may be driven from the age of 16. To obtain a permit, applicants must pass a written or computer-based test to obtain a learner's licence, and then pass a road test to obtain the driving license. Categories for permits include CODE B (normal vehicles), CODE C1 (LDV), CODE EC (heavy trucks), CODE A (motorcycle). The learners licence theory test will contain three sets of questions with multiple answer options; test-takers will have to select the correct answer. Some Driving Licence Test Centres use computers for the test, whereas others require test-takers to complete the test using a test paper and pen.

==== Tanzania ====
Driving licences are issued by the Tanzania Revenue Authority. The legal driving age for motorcycles is 16 and for other motor vehicles is 18.

==== Zimbabwe ====
Zimbabwean drivers licences are issued by the Vehicle Inspection Department (VID) which is an arm of the government under the Ministry of Transport & Infrastructural Development. Drivers can be licensed for class 4 vehicles at the age of sixteen and eighteen for class 2 vehicles. Public transport vehicles are in class 1 and the minimum age is twenty five. A theory based learners licence which has 25 questions is the first step. The questions for this test include diagrams, road rules and road signs and has to be answered in under eight minutes. After passing the test, the candidate gets a provisional learners license which enables the candidate to drive under supervision from a driving instructor or anyone with a full driving licence.

Vehicle class	Type of vehicles	Description	Minimum age	Minimum test score
Class 1	Buses	Public service vehicles (for passenger transport)	25	100%
Class 2	Trucks	Heavy vehicles with net mass above 2,300 kg	18	100%
Class 3	Motorcycles	Motorcycles	16	88%
Class 4	Cars	Light motor vehicles under 2,300 kg net mass	16	88%
Class 5	Tractors/Earth moving equipment	Farm and construction vehicles	16	88%

After the theory test learner drivers have to start practical driving lessons covering key driving skills. To qualify for a driving test one must have completed thirty lessons.

Skills tested in the driving test include:

Skill	Description	Skill being tested
Hill Start	Starting vehicle on an upward incline and proceeding without rolling backwards	Clutch control
Three Point Turn	Turning a vehicle around to face the opposite direction in a limited space	Use of gears, mirrors and vehicle control
Parallel Parking	Parking a vehicle parallel to the road in line with other parked vehicles	Maneuvering around other vehicles, reversing and clutch control
Reversing	Commonly known as drums because candidates have to successfully reverse through a set of drums without bumping into any – an immediate fail	Vehicle control in reverse and clutch control
City Driving	Driving through urban roads, route planning and avoidance of busy roads and intersections	Observing road rules and signs attention to hazards. Special attention to pedestrians and cyclists. Paying attention to actions of other road users

=== Asia ===
==== Hong Kong ====
The minimum age for holding a driving permit is 18 for private cars, light goods vehicle, motorcycles and motor-tricycles. For commercial vehicles the age is 21.

Drivers are legally obliged to carry a valid driving licence whilst driving and this must be produced if required to do so by a police officer.

People older than 70 have to undergo strict medical tests in order to obtain a permit that has limited validity and requires renewal after a certain period.

==== India ====
The minimum driving age in India is 16 to drive any kind of gearless motorcycle like scooters and mopeds, and 18 for cars, three wheelers (with automatic or manual transmissions) and motorcycles with gear like motorcycles or scooters with manual transmissions.

Unlike certain countries which issue driving licenses based on the engine capacity of vehicles, transmission is the only criteria for issuing licenses in India.

Every state and union territory have Regional Transport Offices (RTO/RTA) which issue their own driving licenses to people living in their jurisdictions. Drivers are legally obliged to carry a valid driving license in India while operating a vehicle, and it must be produced if required to do so by a police officer.

People applying for a driving license for the first time, or adding a class of vehicle in their existing license have to apply for a learner's license (LL) first, which is valid for six months. This legally certifies LL holders as valid drivers as long as they drive only for training and have a licensed driver accompanying them. Driving a vehicle on public roads without a licensed driver or a trainer is an offence which attracts fines.

After the training, people apply for a permanent driving license test at their nearest RTOs. This can be done anytime before the expiry of the LL. A person is given a total of three attempts in these six months, and if one fails the third attempt, they have to go through the application of a new license all over again.

In India, people aged 50 or more, have to undergo strict medical tests in order to obtain a permit that has limited validity and requires renewal every five years. A Commercial Driving License is valid for 3 years and then requires to be renewed.

India introduced the universal smart card driving license in October 2019, and set up a nationwide driving license database to fight against duplication.

==== Indonesia ====
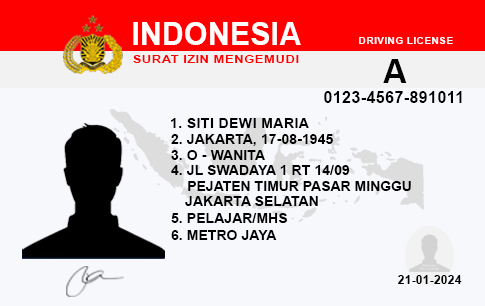
Front side of the Indonesian Driving License card "A" class for driving normal 4 wheel car/jeep vehicle

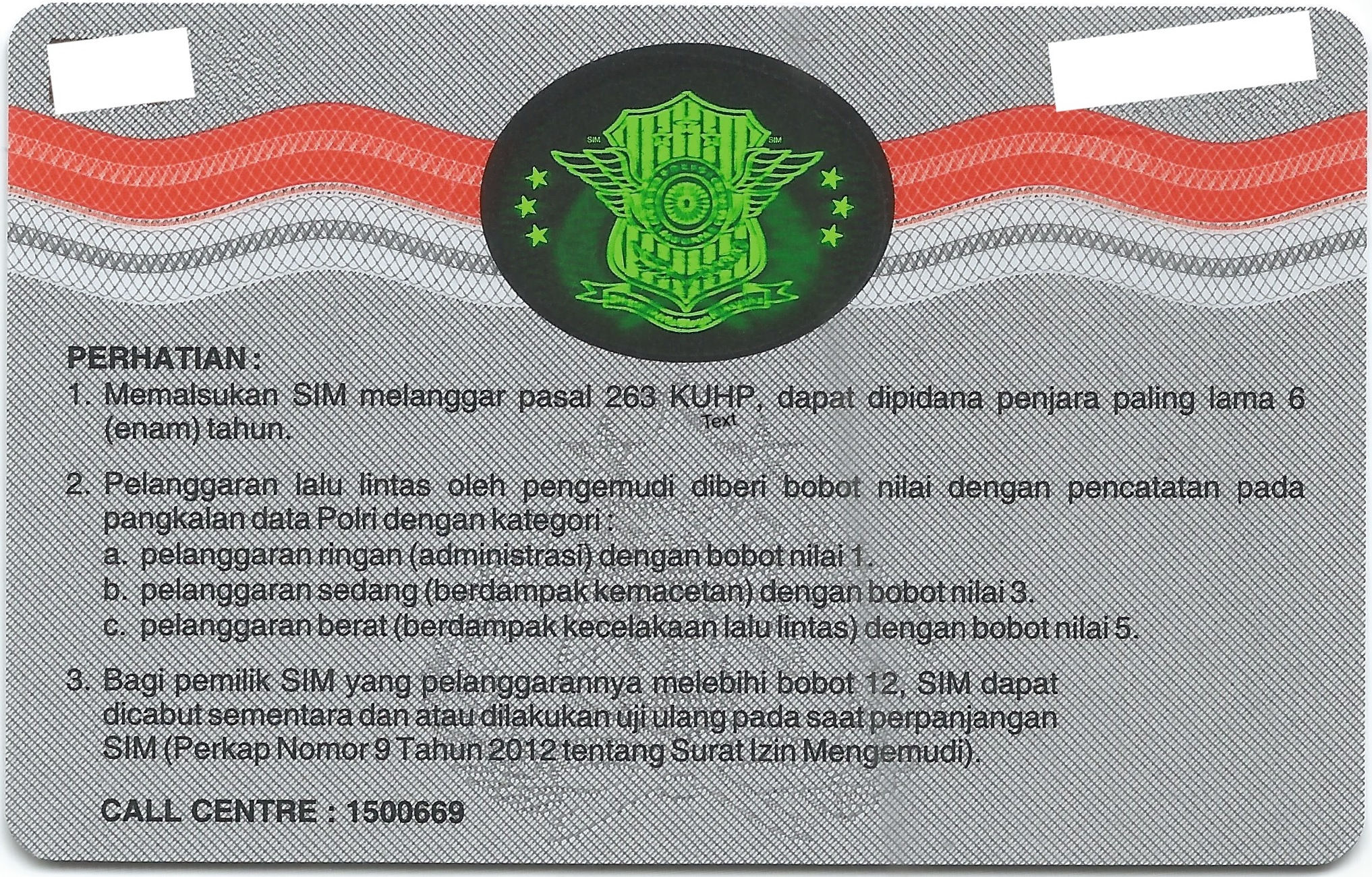
Rear/back side of the Indonesian driving license card

In Indonesia, to drive a motor vehicle, one must own a legal Indonesian Driving License (Indonesian: Surat Izin Mengemudi or SIM). It is a card which legally permits one to drive a motor vehicle. In Indonesia, there are classes for each driving license for which is allowed to drive a type of motor vehicle:

- A – to drive private passenger or cargo vehicle with weight allowed not exceeding 3,500 kg (7,700 lb)
- A Public (A UMUM) – to drive commercial vehicles and goods carrier to the amount of weight that is allowed does not exceed 3,500 kg (7,700 lb)
- B1 – to drive private passenger or cargo vehicle with weight allowed exceeding 3,500 kg (7,700 lb)
- B1 Public (B1 UMUM) – to drive passenger vehicles and general freight allowed amount of weight over 3,500 kg (7,700 lb)
- B2 – to drive heavy equipment vehicles, towing vehicles, or motor vehicles with attractive patch or trailer train individuals with severe or patches are allowed to train more than 1,000 kg (2,200 lb) trailer/s
- B2 Public (B2 UMUM) – to drive commercial vehicles for towing or pull cart trailer with heavy patch that are allowed to train more than 1,000 kg trailer
- C – to drive motorcycles (two-wheeled motor vehicle)
- D – special vehicle for disabled person

The classes above are also allowed by the age of the driver according to the class of the driving license. The ages are accordingly issued to the different classes of the driver's choice:

- 17 years old for issue of Driving License class: A, C, and D
- 20 years old for issue of Driving License class: B1
- 21 years old for issue of Driving License class: B2

==== Japan ====
Japanese driver's licenses bear one of the following 3 colors on the expiration date.

===== Green =====
New Drivers (first license in Japan) is valid for 2 to 3 years. Drivers with under one year of driving experience are required to display a "Shoshinsha mark" (Young Leaf Mark) on their vehicle. This holds true if the driver acquires a license for a different class of vehicle, regardless of the length of driving experience on their previous license. However, such a mark does not indicate necessarily the color on the driver's license. A driver with a young leaf mark on their car could very well be a gold driver. This is because the gold status does not disappear with a change in vehicle class.

===== Blue =====
Drivers who have fewer than 5 years of clean driving history or who do not have a clean driving record but more than 5 years of driving history. Valid for 3 to 5 years depending on age, violation history, etc.

===== Gold =====
In addition to the regular license, the Gold Driver's License (ゴールド免許, Gōrudo Menkyo), or Superior Drivers License (優良運転者免許証, Yūryō Untensha Menkyoshō), is a special designation of license given to "superior drivers" (優良運転者) in Japan. Holders of such licenses can be identified by the gold band printed over the expiration date of their driver's license.

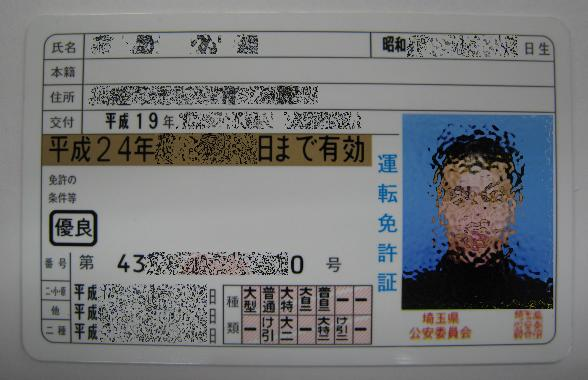
Superior Driver's License (Gold License)

The Gold License is granted to any driver who, at the point of license renewal, has at least five years of clean driving history (no driving infractions). According to implications in the Road Traffic Laws Reforms that took place on 10 May 1995, all such licenses are marked with a gold band over the license's expiration date as well as the word 優良 (excellent) printed in black, below.

Those who hold a gold license have the added benefit of qualifying for the Superior Drivers Course at the time of renewal, a significantly shorter and less-expensive renewal process. In some cases, they can bypass the main license center and have their license renewed at a separate Superior Drivers License Renewal Center.

Moreover, because such license holders are proven to have been free of accidents and moving violations for at least five years, they are deemed low-risk and qualify for optional car insurance discounts. To qualify, drivers must be accident and violation-free for 5 years and 41 days prior to their birthday on their license's expiration. The period in which the license holder's driving history is reviewed begins on the 40th day prior to their birthday of that year. Should the license holder be deemed to qualify, they will receive a decision in the mail with the word 優良 printed on it.

Even the "Paper Drivers" who hold licenses but never drive, who technically are without violation or accident, can lose their eligibility to obtain a gold license for several reasons including if their car is used by a drunk driver or to support drunk driving in any way.

==== Malaysia ====
The minimum age for obtaining a driving licence varies between 16 and 21, although there is a concern about teenage driving safety.

As of November 2011, drivers can renew their licence on their birthday, rather than expiry date.

==== Nepal ====
The minimum age for a permit to ride two wheelers is 16. For light vehicles with four wheels it is 18. After 2 years experience with light vehicles a permit can be obtained to drive private hire and heavy vehicles. However, once the age of 60 years is reached permits can not be renewed for private hire and heavy vehicles.

There is an online procedure hosted by Nepal's Department of Transport Management with a written exam only for new applicants. Subsequent written exams are not necessary to add additional categories to an existing permit. A practical, road test is undertaken after passing the written exam.

==== Pakistan ====
The minimum age for eligibility for a learner's permit is 18 years. Drivers' information is recorded against the Computerized National ID Card number which is issued at the age of 18. The Licence Issuing Authorities vary in each district and work under the relevant District Police.

A new credit card format driving licence has been introduced. The licence bears the digital photo, signature and blood group information of the card holder. A record of traffic violations is stored automatically in the database. To obtain a driving licence one must register for a learner's permit at any of the local District Police's designated licence offices and then, after 42 days, one can apply for test for a regular full licence.

The test phase consists of a theory based test followed by a short practical test. Only those who pass the theory test are allowed to take the practical test. The whole test stage is a single day process where both tests are to be taken the same day. The driving licence currently issued holds basic information of the driver including name, Father's name, date of birth, address, authorized vehicle types, emergency contact, blood group, fingerprint impression, driver photo. The licence also has a magnetic strip though its viability is yet to be made public.

==== Philippines ====
Driving permits in the Philippines consists of three types. These are Student Permit, Non-Professional and Professional. The minimum age for driving in the Philippines is 17 years old provided that the driver has applied for a Student Permit and is accompanied by a person with a Professional or Non-Professional permit. An applicant can only apply for a Non-Professional driving license one month after acquiring a Student Permit. An applicant needs to have a Non-Professional driving license for 1 week in order to be eligible for a Professional driving license. An applicant must pass both the Land Transportation Office written exam and a practical driving exam. If the applicant fails the tests, the applicant must wait for a month before being able to take the tests again.

==== Singapore ====
Driving licences in Singapore are issued by the traffic police. The minimum age to obtain a provisional driving licence (PDL), which allows the holder to practice driving while under the supervision of an authorised driving instructor, is 18. A provisional driving licence is obtained once the individual has passed the basic theory test. PDL holders are then required to sit for and pass the final theory test before they are allowed to sit for the practical driving test. Once they have passed the practical driving test, they are issued with a driving licence which allows for driving without supervision, though new drivers are required to display probationary plates when driving for the first year after their licence is issued.

==== South Korea ====
In South Korea, one must hold a driving license called "운전면허증" or an international driving permit. The international driving permit is valid for 1 year starting from the date of entry. If one is going to stay in South Korea longer than a year, it is necessary to change the international permit to a local permit by visiting the driver's license testing center.

For South Korean driving licenses, there are classes which permit driving different types of motor vehicle:

- 1st Class (1종)
  - Large (대형) – A permit which allows one to drive every vehicle except trailers and wreckers. It allows one to drive cargo truck, passenger bus, construction equipment for commercial purposes. Type 1 Large permit holders can apply for a tram driving license.
  - Ordinary (보통) – Allows one to drive a vehicle with less than 15 seats, an emergency motor vehicle with less than 12 seats, a cargo truck with a load limit of 12 tonnes, a construction equipment which weighs less than 3 tonnes (does not include trailers and wreckers), a special motor vehicle which weighs less than 10 tonnes (does not include trailers and wreckers).
  - Small (소형) – Allows one to drive a tricycle and a motorcycle. Not issued since 1984.
  - Special (특수)
    - Large Trailer (대형견인차) – Allows one to drive all types of trailer.
    - Small Trailer (소형견인차) – Allows one to drive a trailer under 3 tonnes with powered vehicle under 3.5 tonnes.
    - Wrecker (구난) – Allows one to drive a tow truck.
- 2nd Class (2종)
  - Ordinary (보통) – Allows one to drive a vehicle with less than 10 seats, a cargo truck with a load limit of 4 tonnes, a special motor vehicle which weighs less than 3.5 tonnes (does not include trailers and wreckers).
  - Small (소형) – Allows one to drive all types of motorcycle.
  - Motorized Bicycle (원동기장치자전거) – Allows one to drive a motorcycle under 125cc.
- Practice License (Equivalent to Learner's Permit)
  - 1st Class (1종) – Allows one to drive a vehicle with less than 15 seats, a cargo truck with a load limit of 12 tonnes, when the driver is driving with somebody with a non-practice license.
  - 2nd Class (2종) – Allows one to drive a vehicle with less than 10 seats, a cargo truck with a load limit of 4 tonnes, when the driver is driving with somebody with a non-practice license.

Besides the type of the license, the license may have a special condition. Depending on the special condition given, the driver must satisfy the condition below to be able to drive. Driving a vehicle without satisfying the given condition is considered as unlicensed driving.

- A – Automatic Transmission Only
- B – Drive with prosthetic hand or arm
- C – Drive with prosthetic leg
- D – Wear hearing aid when driving
- E – Drive with Hearing-Impaired Sign + Convex Mirror
- I – Drive a car with a gas pedal located in the left.
- J – All-terrain vehicle only

==== Sri Lanka ====
New E-Smart Card driving licences are available in Sri Lanka. These cards are intended for use in the proposed "Point System".

In Sri Lanka, a driving licence is the official document which authorizes its holder to operate various types of motor vehicles on public roads. They are administered by the Department of Motor Traffic (DMT). The minimum age is 18 years for all vehicle types.

==== Taiwan ====
In Taiwan, driving permits (駕駛執照) are issued by the Ministry of Transportation and Communications to qualified drivers. The number of the driver's license is the same as the ID number of the license holder's household registration in Taiwan. In Taiwan, the license is sometimes accepted as a valid identity document, since the information on it replicates most of what is on a Taiwanese National Identification Card.

==== Thailand ====
Driving in Thailand without a driving licence is prohibited and is punishable by fines. Moreover, in case of a road accident, a driver without a permit can be considered as the guilty party. Also, an unlicensed driver who was in a road accident will be refused medical insurance payments

It is not difficult to get a driving licence in Thailand. In fact it is accessible to foreigners too. When the package of documents will be collected the person needs to appeal to the Transport Authority and sign up for the exam. Waiting time usually is near one month.

The exam includes theoretical and practical parts held on the same day. Reaction tests are conducted before the exam. The applicant gets a temporary ID valid for one year. It may be extended for five years, but only if the applicant lives in Thailand on a non-immigrant visa. An International Driving Permit is recognized in Thailand. With its help it is easy to get a local permit without doing the exams.

There are different plastic cards for motorcycles and vehicles. Therefore, documents and exams need to be done twice.

Privileges of a Thai driving licence holder:

- A driving licence can be used for identification purposes
- Discounts (up to five-fold discounts) for sightseeing, museums, etc. can be obtained
- Thai (5-year extended) licences are valid in the following countries: Myanmar, Laos, Cambodia, Vietnam, Brunei, Malaysia, Indonesia, Singapore, Philippines.
- International Driving Permit (five-years validity) can be obtained on the basis of five-years Thai licence.

==== Vietnam ====
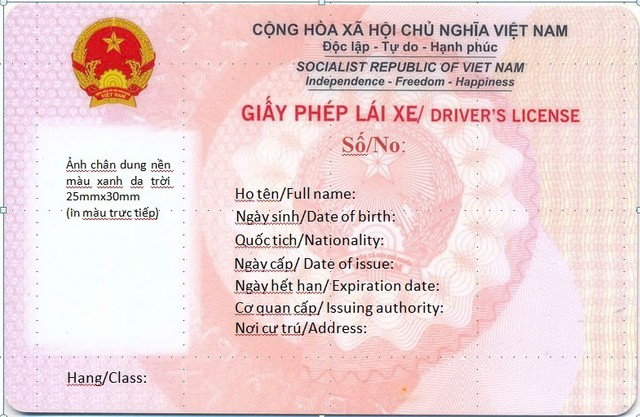
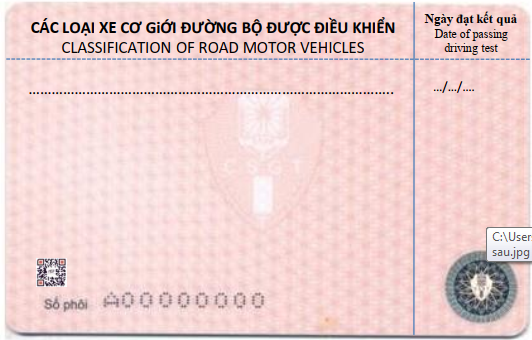
A sample Vietnamese driver's license (since March 1, 2025)

Vietnam has a minimum age of 16 for mopeds under 50 cc (3.1 cu in) and 18 for motorcycles producing more than 50 cc (3.1 cu in). Minimum age for holding a driving permit is 18 for cars and small truck, 21 for commercial vehicles.

Drivers are legally obliged to carry a valid driving licence whilst driving and this must be produced if required to do so by a police officer.

Under the Law on Road Traffic Order and Safety (effective from January 1, 2025), driving licenses in Vietnam are classified as follows:

- A1 – Motorcycles with engine displacement up to 125 cc or electric motor power up to 11 kW. A1 license has no expiry date.
- A – Motorcycles with engine displacement above 125 cc or electric motor power above 11 kW. A license has no expiry date.
- B1 – Three-wheeled passenger motorcycles or four-wheeled motorcycles (quadricycles) designed for cargo or passenger transport. B1 license has no expiry date.
- B – Passenger cars with up to 8 seats (excluding the driver); trucks and tractors with a gross vehicle weight (GVW) not exceeding 3,500 kg. This class replaces the former B1 (automatic) and B2 classes. B license is valid for 10 years.
- C1 – Trucks and tractors with a GVW between 3,500 kg and 7,500 kg. C1 license is valid for 5 years.
- C – Trucks and tractors with a GVW exceeding 7,500 kg. C license is valid for 5 years.
- D1 – Passenger vehicles with 8 to 16 seats (excluding the driver). D1 license is valid for 5 years.
- D2 – Passenger vehicles with 16 to 29 seats (excluding the driver). D2 license is valid for 5 years.
- D – Passenger vehicles with more than 29 seats (excluding the driver) and sleeper buses. D license is valid for 5 years.
- BE, C1E, CE, D1E, D2E, DE – Licenses permitting the operation of vehicles in the respective classes (B, C1, C, D1, D2, D) while towing a trailer with a mass exceeding 750 kg. These licenses are valid for 5 years.

Notes on Condition Codes: According to Circular 12/2025/TT-BCA, specific limitations are printed on the back of the license using codes (e.g., A.03 for legacy A1 licenses limited to under 175cc, or B.01 for drivers restricted to automatic transmission vehicles).

The classes above are also allowed by the age of the driver according to the class of the driving license. The ages are accordingly issued to the different classes of the driver's choice:

- 18 years old for issue of Driving License class: A1, A, B1, B, C1
- 21 years old for issue of Driving License class: C, BE
- 24 years old for issue of Driving License class: D1, D2, C1E, CE
- 27 years old for issue of Driving License class: D, D1E, D2E, DE

=== European Economic Area ===
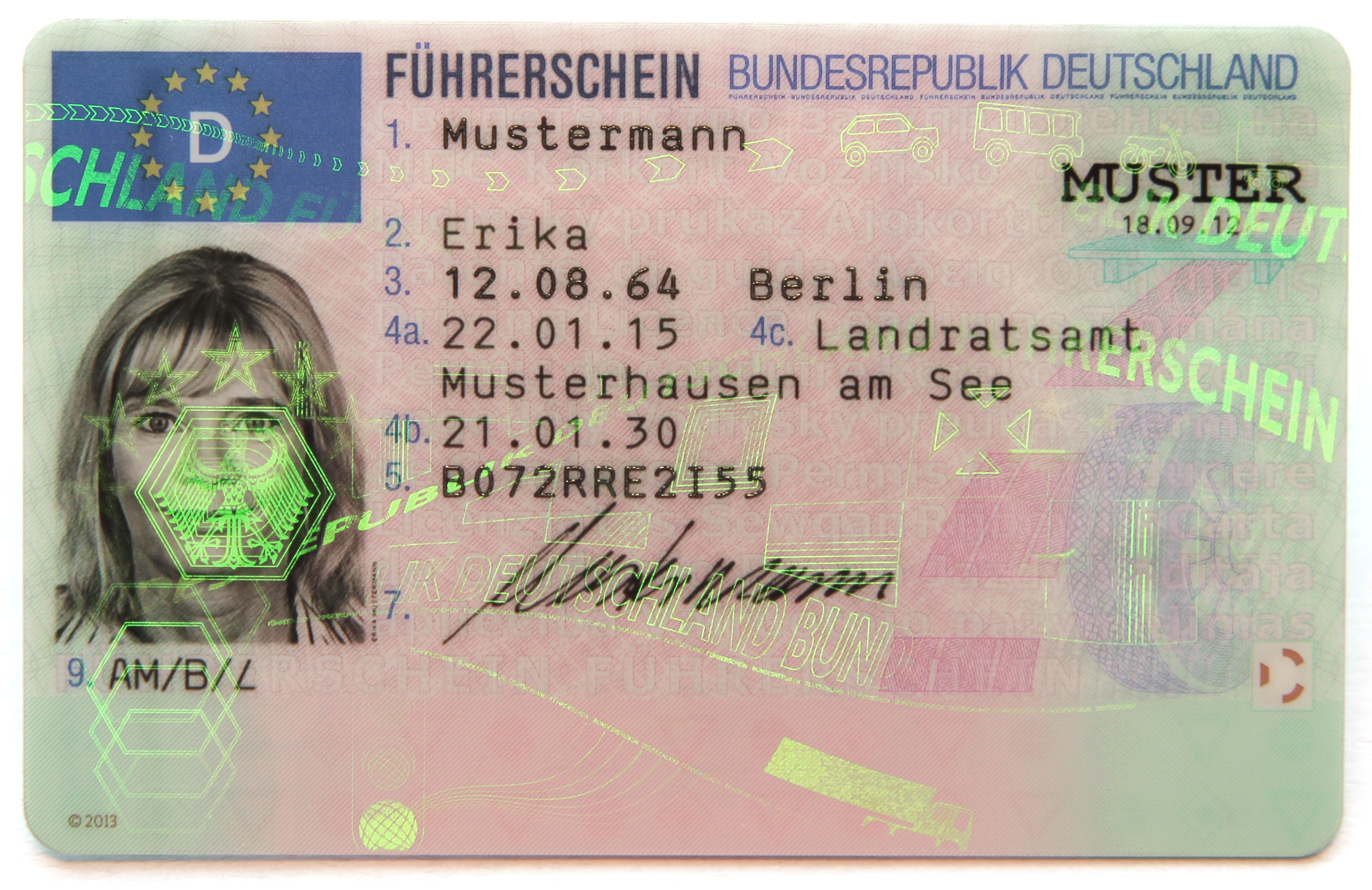
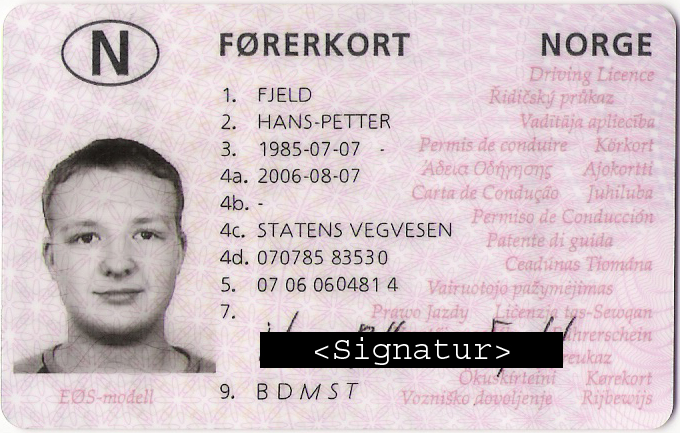
A German (EU) driving permit issued after 19 January 2013 (Directive 2006/126/EC) and a Norwegian (EEA) issued before (Directive 91/439/EEC)

The European Union has adopted a common format for driving permits within all 30 European Economic Area member states (EU, Iceland, Liechtenstein and Norway), and a common set of driving permit categories. There are other national categories for tractors, large motorcycles, motorised wheel boats, motor tricycles (modern voiturettes, Category B1 or S), and military categories such as for driving tanks. National categories mean they are not harmonised and only valid within the issuing country.

The European driving licence was introduced to replace the 110 different plastic and paper driving permits. The common format with the same information in the same place on all permits allows documents to be understood, even if they are in a different language.

The system for handling the penalty points remains different in each country, for the existence of points, initial number of points, revolving, and number of points removed (or added) for each penalty.

Driver's licences have in Europe a categorisation based on the following letters:

- A – Motorcycles
- B – Cars and similar light vehicles
- C – Heavy goods vehicle
- D – Heavy buses
- E – Trailers

The categories have become more complicated with subcategories. The letter E is now always used with another category.

==== Iceland ====
The minimum age for getting a driver's licence in Iceland is 17 for a B class license, a B class licence will qualify a person to drive low powered motorcycles (50 cc (3.1 cu in) two stroke or equivalent, for more powerful bikes one will have to obtain an A class license), Tractors, ATVs and automobiles that do not exceed a GVWR of 3,500 kg (7,700 lb) or 8 passengers.

The minimum age in Iceland to get a C1 class (vehicles up to 7,500 kg (16,500 lb) GVWR) is 18, for a C class (vehicles exceeding 7,500 kg) one will have to have obtained a 12-point licence (obtainable without getting a ticket for a whole year) and have reached the age of 21 years.

The minimum age in Iceland for a D1 class licence is 21 years old and D class (and DE class) license is 23 years old, the same rules apply as with a C/CE class license.

==== Norway ====
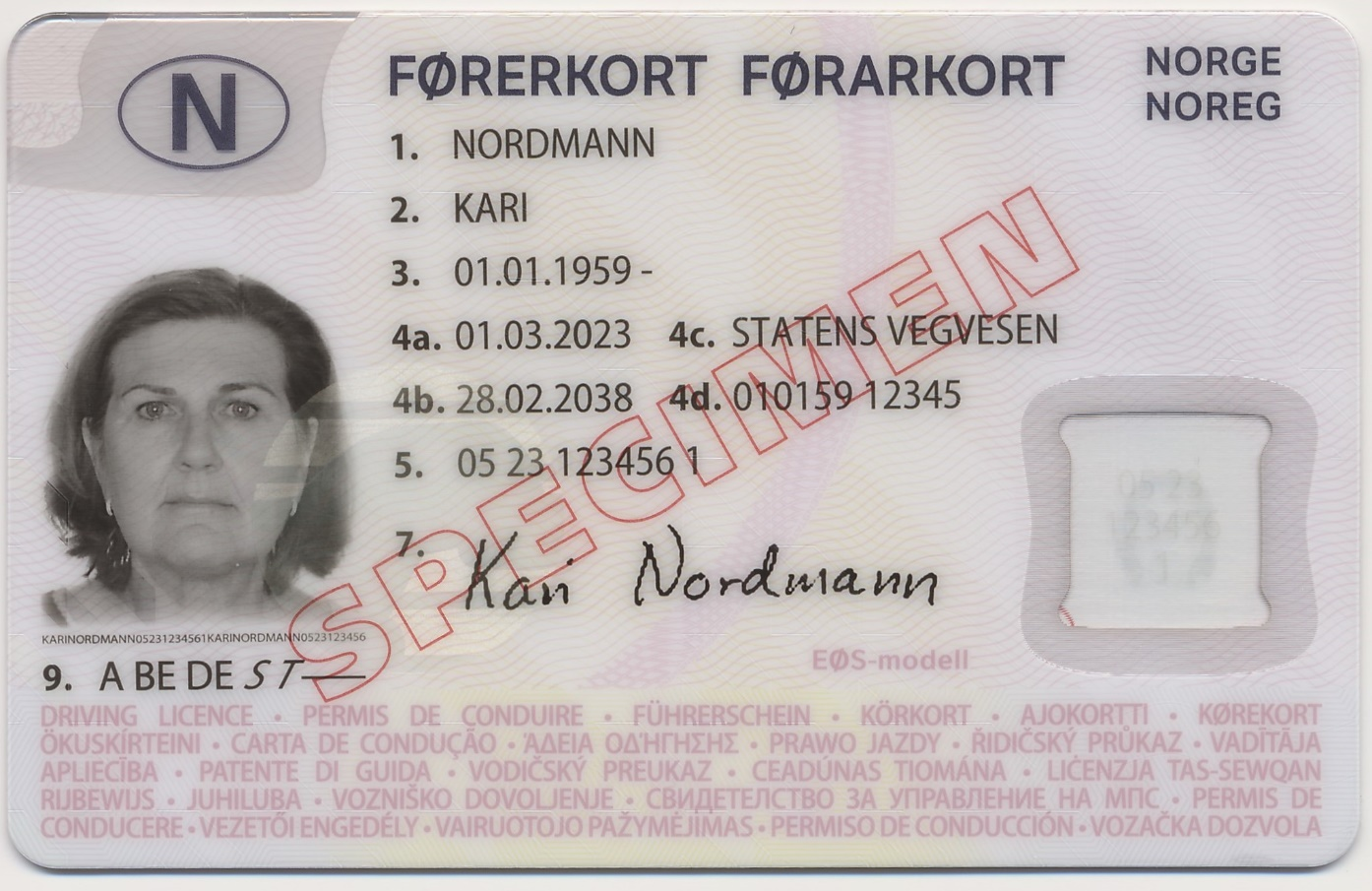
Norway driving licence

The minimum age for getting a driving licence in Norway is 16 for A1, T (tractor), 18 for A-C1, 21 for C/D1 and 24 for D. The driver's licenses issued before 2013 are revoked when he/she has reached an age of 100. The driving licences for A-B, BE, S and T issued after 2013 are always revoked after 15 years, and can be renewed after that for more 15 years. For persons aged 60–75, the driving licence becomes invalid before the 75th birthday and subsequently a valid health certificate is needed. Then a driving licences is issued with the same length as the health certificate. The driving licences for C-D1E are revoked after 5 years and can be renewed after that for 5 more years and, with a valid health certificate a new license for C-D1E is issued every year after the age of 70.

==== Poland ====
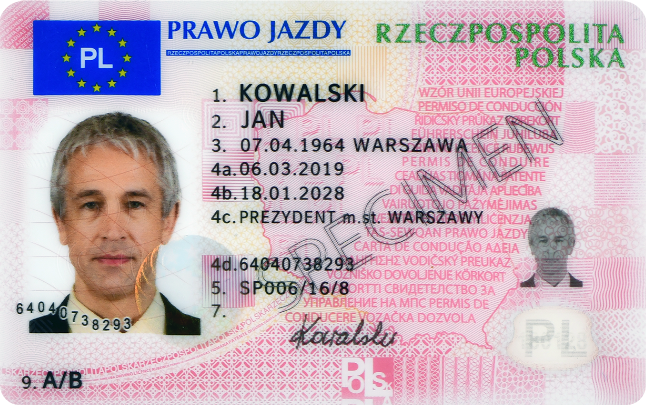
Polish driving licence

Minimum age to obtain category B driving licence in Poland is 18, category C1 and C1+E is also 18. The minimum age to obtain category C and C+E is 21 years of age. Category D (large bus) is 24.

==== Romania ====
The minimum age for obtaining a driver's license in Romania is 18 ("Minimum legal age in Romania")

=== Rest of Europe ===
==== Azerbaijan ====
In Azerbaijan, driving licences are issued to citizens who meet the minimum age requirements and successfully pass both theoretical and practical examinations. Licences are administered by the State Traffic Police (DYP) under the Ministry of Internal Affairs.

Minimum age by category:

- A (motorcycles): 16 years
- B (cars, light trucks): 18 years
- C (heavy trucks): 18 years
- D (buses): 21 years
- BE / CE / DE (vehicles with trailers): Varies; requires prior entitlement and experience

Applicants must provide a national ID card or passport, a medical certificate, proof of completion of a driving course, and evidence of payment of the state fee. The theoretical examination tests knowledge of traffic rules, while the practical examination evaluates driving skills and vehicle handling.

Foreign visitors are advised to obtain an International Driving Permit (IDP) to drive legally in Azerbaijan.

==== Kazakhstan ====
In Kazakhstan, driver's licenses are issued by the Ministry of Internal Affairs (MIA RK) through front-office services at Citizen Service Centers (CSCs), which are branches of the state corporation "Government for Citizens".

The minimum age to obtain a driving license is 18 years for cars, 16 years for motorcycles, and 21 years for buses and commercial vehicles. Learner permits are available before full licensing and require the holder to be supervised by a licensed driver.

Licenses are issued in a credit-card sized plastic format, with the cardholder's photo, signature, and authorized vehicle categories. A digital driver's license has been integrated into the national e-Government portal (eGov.kz) since 2020, allowing holders to present their license via a mobile application.

Applicants must pass both a theoretical exam (on traffic rules and road safety) and a practical driving test. Driving license categories follow the standard system, including:

- A / A1 – motorcycles
- B / B1 – cars and light vehicles
- C / C1 – trucks
- D / D1 – buses
- E – trailers
- Other specialized categories are defined for agricultural and construction vehicles

Licenses are valid for a fixed period and may require renewal or updating in case of changes in vehicle categories or personal information. Digital licenses are recognized by law and can be used in lieu of physical cards when interacting with authorities.

==== North Macedonia ====
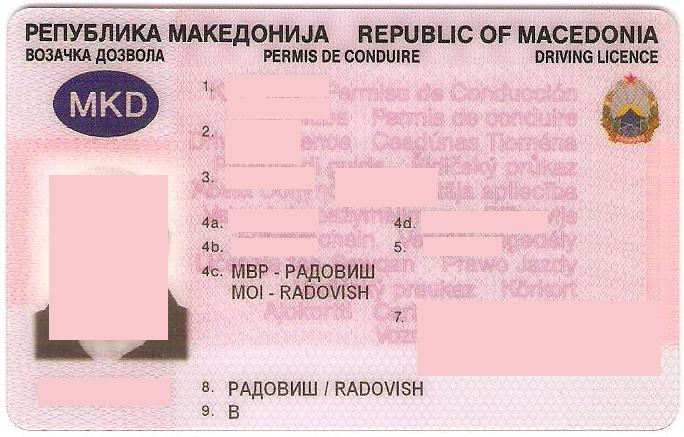
North Macedonia driving license

The minimum age to obtain a driving licence is 16 years. During the first two years after obtaining the licence the driver is called a beginner (Macedonian: почетник) and has limited rights concerning driving speed and when he/she can drive without a co-driver in the front seat who does not have a drivers licence (until 23:00). Beginning in 2007, the driving licence format was changed from a pink booklet to a credit-card sized card.

==== Russia ====
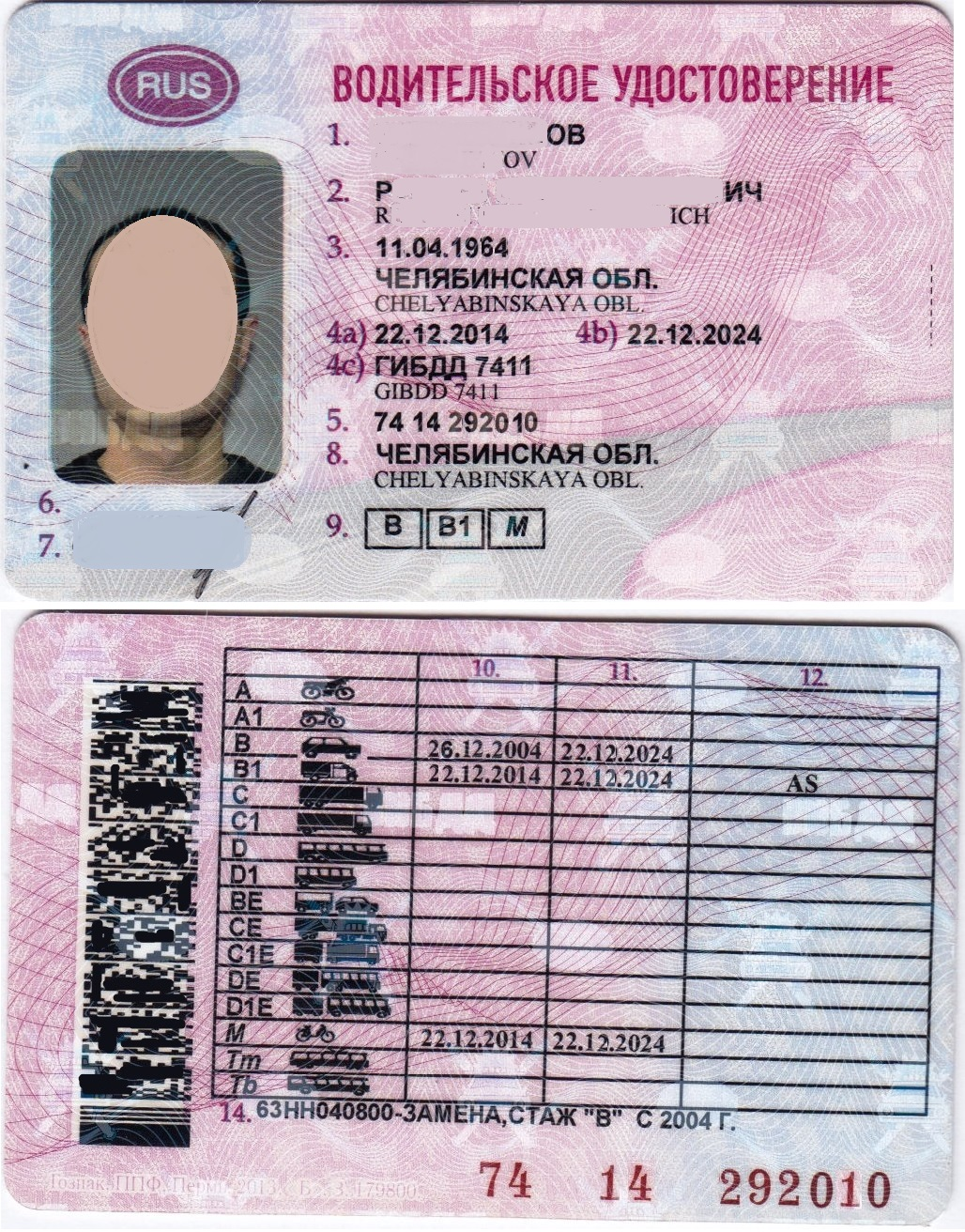
Driving license, 2014

Russia was one of the first countries to create a driving licence. In 1895, the mayor of Saint Petersburg, Baron von Wahl issued permits to ride “motorised bicycles.” The year following, the Minister of Railways and Communication laid down the first code for cars. Russia's first licences were issued in 1900 by Saint Petersburg authorities, and Russia joined an international convention in 1909. However, due to a relatively small number of cars, the attempts to create a standardized Russian licence were rather sporadic and limited to major urban areas. No comprehensive system of driver licensing was present until 1936, when the Soviet government organized and standardized traffic and driving regulations, with the statewide system regulated by specialized police authorities (GAI).

Russia employs a system of driver's licences very similar to the EU standard. Since 2014, there are 14 main categories that require a driving licence: A, A1, B, B1, C, C1, D, D1, BE, CE, C1E, DE, D1E, M and two additional categories: Tm (tram) and Tb (trolleybus).

The current licence style, introduced in 2011, is a laminated plastic card similar to the European driving licence card in dimensions and outward appearance, with the bearer's photo and name (in Latin and Cyrillic scripts), place/date of issue, allowed categories, and signature. The reverse of the card features a detailed list of allowed categories. This new style is fully compliant with the Vienna Convention on Road Traffic, and therefore is acceptable in all its signatory states and countries. Older credit-card-style and booklet-style licenses are also occasionally seen although they are no longer issued and are increasingly rare as a result. The Russian driving licence is also sometimes supplemented by a special card called "временное разрешение" (temporary permission), which serves for registering offense points and as a temporary licence if the primary license has been seized by the authorities for serious traffic offenses. This supplement has been abolished and reinstated a countless number of times as the views of the traffic police change.

The legal driving age within the Russian Federation is 18 years (16 for motorcycles (A1 and M categories only, not A) and 20 for buses) and to obtain a license one must be physically fit to drive (including certificates of mental fitness and no record of substance abuse). One must also pass a test administered at a local traffic police authority and pay a fee. Tests are divided into theory and practice. The theory test is usually a computerized multiple-choice test on various traffic rules. Twenty multiple-choice questions are asked, only two incorrect answers allowed for a passing grade, five additional questions per mistake. A road test is then administered which includes a demonstration of basic driving skills (steering, slope starting for manual transmission vehicles and backing-up), obstacle course as well as a skills examination for road driving. Four minor errors are allowed for the road driving examination—the obstacle course is pass-fail. The number of retries is unlimited.

Driving licences are issued by subdivisions of the General Administration for Traffic Safety of the Ministry of Internal Affairs and grant the right to drive on-road vehicles only. The right to drive off-road vehicles is granted by tractorist-machinist's licence, which is issued by state inspections of the supervision of the technical condition of self-propelled machines and other machinery Гостехнадзор (these state inspections are parts of the regional governments of federal subjects of Russia and may have different names). The Ministry of Agriculture approves the form of the license and the procedure for issuing it. There are 9 categories in tractorist-machinist's licence: AI (quad bikes, snowmobiles and other off-road vehicles with steering that is similar to motorcycle's steering), AII (wheeled cross-country vehicles weighing less than 3,500 kg, including amphibious snow-and-swamp vehicles such as TREKOL-39294, VIKING-29031, etc.), AIII (haul trucks), AIV (off-road buses), B (wheeled and caterpillar tractors with engine power less than 25,7 kW), C (wheeled tractors with engine power from 25,7 kW to 110,3 kW), D (wheeled tractors with engine power over 110,3 kW), E (caterpillar tractors with engine power over 25,7 kW), F (self-propelled agricultural machinery). To obtain the tractorist-machinist's license with AII category applicant must have at least 1-year driving experience by category B of driving licence, AIII category – category C of driving licence, AIV category – category D of driver's license. For getting the tractorist-machinist's licence applicant has to pass theoretical and practice exam on the program approved by the Ministry of Agriculture. If the applicant does not have the driver's license he or she also has to pass a theoretical exam on the program approved by the General Administration for Traffic Safety of the Ministry of Internal Affairs (knowledge of traffic rules). In the case of deprivation of driving licence by court decision, both licences are lost.

==== Switzerland ====
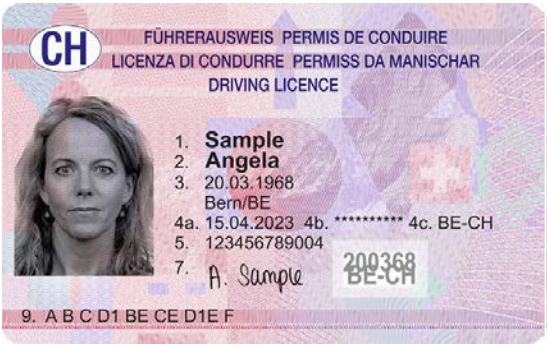
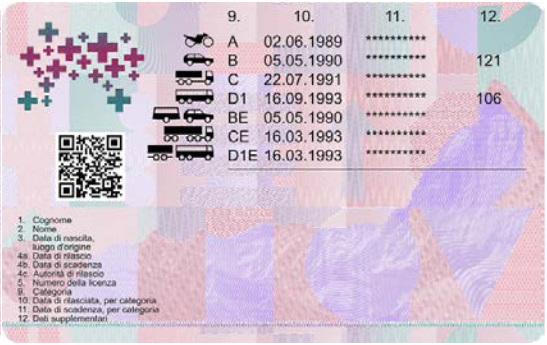
Swiss driving licence

Even though Switzerland is an EFTA member state, it is not a member of the European Economic Area. Switzerland is instead linked to the EU by a series of bilateral agreements and has generally adopted much of the harmonized EU legislation with regard to driving licenses. Swiss licences can be exchanged in most EEA countries. Switzerland has, since the 2000s, used a system similar to the EU system of vehicle categories and issued credit-card licences that resemble EEA-style.

To apply for a car driving licence (category B), the applicant must be 17 years old. They must first attend a first-aid course, and pass an eyesight test. Passing a theory exam is required to receive a learner's permit valid for two years. This allows the holder to drive a car only when accompanied by a person 23 years of age or older who has had a full driver's license for at least three years. Before passing the practical exam, the candidate must attend 10 hours of theory lessons on "familiarization with road traffic". Practical driving lessons are not legally required, but are considered a de facto prerequisite for passing the practical exam taken with a government official Driving Test Examiner. If the applicant is between 17 and 19 years old, a mandatory 12-month waiting period has to be passed before taking the practical exam. Upon passing the practical exam, a probationary driving permit is issued for three years. To obtain the full, unlimited driving licence after these three years, the candidate must attend one day of further driving training and must not commit any serious traffic violations.

For motorcycles and heavier vehicles, the regulations are different, and some agrarian vehicles can be driven without a permit. As of 2011, a 45-minute driving lesson costs around CHF 90, while the various fees and theoretical instruction costs associated with getting a car driving licence can amount to up to CHF 600, without counting the costs for the two days of further training.

The theoretical exam must be taken in either German, French, or Italian. In some cantons it is possible to take the exam in English.

National classes, not harmonised and only valid within the issuing country:

Class	Description	Age minimum	Valid in
F	Tractor <= 45 kilometres per hour (28 mph)	16	Switzerland
G	Tractor <= 30 kilometres per hour (19 mph)	14	Switzerland
M	Moped <= 30 kilometres per hour (19 mph)	14	Switzerland

==== Turkey ====
Turkey has been an associate member since 1963, and its application to accede to the European Economic Community, the predecessor of the European Union (EU), was made on 14 April 1987. Turkey signed a Customs Union agreement with the EU in 1995 and was officially recognized as a candidate for full membership on 12 December 1999, at the Helsinki summit of the European Council.

On 1 January 2016, new Turkish laws concerning driving licences were implemented. The changes are intended to bring Turkey more in line with existing EU driving regulations and concern all road users in Turkey. A foreign national can drive in Turkey with an EU licence for 6 months. After 6 months, it has to be exchanged for a Turkish licence. Application can be made to any Traffic Registration office but the foreign driving licence will not be returned. Instead they will be sent to the issuing authority of the country of origin i.e. for British nationals, DVLA. The DVLA says that expats can drive in the UK on a Turkish licence for up to 12 months, and if they wish to settle back in the UK, the Turkish licence can be exchanged for a UK license.

In Turkey, there is a minimum age of 18 to drive a car or motorbike and a minimum age of 16 to drive a motorbike (up to 125cc, unless 18+). The driving test comprises a practical and theory test, which has been recently made tougher in order to meet European Union regulations.

==== Ukraine ====
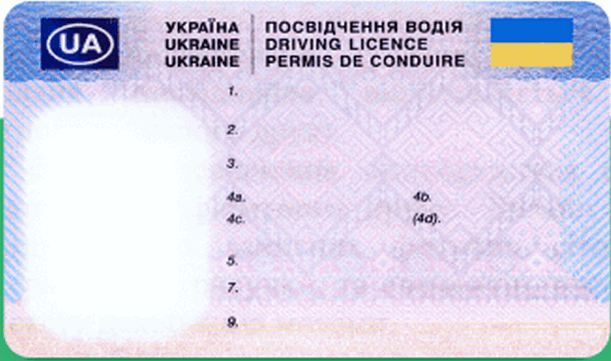
Ukrainian driving licence issued since 2021

Ukrainian driving licences are official documents which authorize their respective holders to operate various types of motor vehicle on public roads.

The right to drive a vehicle is granted to persons who have achieved:

- at the age of 16, it is allowed to open categories A1, A (mopeds and motorcycles);
- at the age of 18 – categories B1, B, C1, C (ATVs, cars, trucks);
- at the age of 19 – categories BE, C1E, CE (trucks with trailers, road trains);
- at the age of 21 – categories D1, D, D1E, DE, T (passenger buses, trams and trolleybuses).

Since 9 February 2017, the service of obtaining an international driver's license has become available in Ukraine. It is issued without exams on the basis of a national driver's license, valid for 3 years.

From 29 December 2021, a mark on passing a practical exam on cars with an automatic transmission in the form of a code "78" will appear in Ukrainian driver's licenses.

==== United Kingdom ====
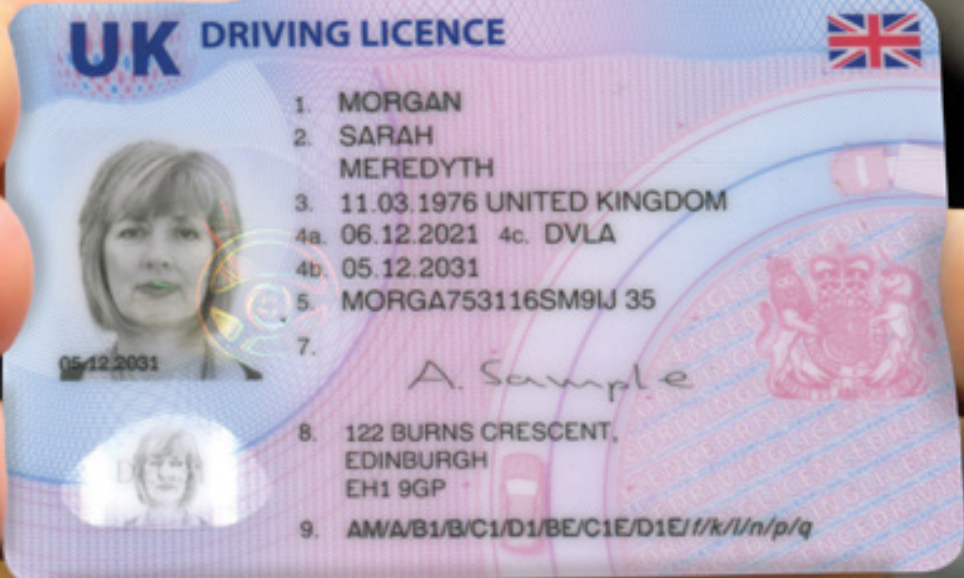
A British driving licence issued in Great Britain after Brexit. UK Driving licences issued by the separate Driver and Vehicle Agency in Northern Ireland are slightly different and do not include either the Union Flag or the Royal Coat of Arms on the right side.

The minimum driving age in the United Kingdom is 16 for mopeds under 50 cc (3.1 cu in), and 17 for cars and motorcycles. Access to motorcycles producing more than 25 kW (34 hp) is restricted to riders with two years experience or aged 21. The British Overseas Territories and the British Crown dependencies issue their own driving licences. There is no legal requirement for a non-professional driver to carry a driving licence in the UK whilst driving, although it must be produced at a police station within seven days, if required to do so by a police officer.

In the United Kingdom, one must hold a Passenger Carrying Vehicle (PCV) Licence to drive a vehicle with more than eight passenger seats for hire or reward, or a Large Goods Vehicle (LGV) Licence to drive a vehicle with a Gross Vehicle Weight (Maximum Authorized Mass) in excess of 3,500 kg (7,700 lb). Licences and Driver Certificate of Professional Competence qualification cards must be carried whilst driving vehicles in such categories. Special licences are also required in order to transport hazardous materials.

Until the UK left the European Union on 1 February 2020, UK driving licences were European driving licences. During the transition period EU law continued to apply to the UK in accordance with the withdrawal agreement, and hence, UK driving licences were valid in the EU and EU driving licences in the UK until the transition period ended 31 December 2020. The EU flag was removed from UK driving licences when the transition period ended. From 1 January 2021, UK licence holders are still able to use their driving licence to drive in the EU for short visits, with some exceptions. International Driving Permits, as well as arrangements within the Common Travel Area, will facilitate driving possibilities between the UK and the EU/EEA countries in those cases.

=== North America ===
==== Barbados ====
In Barbados, a person 16 years or over can apply for a Learner's Permit which allows them to drive for a specified period with an accompanying tutor. During that period, they will be tested on their driving skill and their knowledge of road signs and traffic laws. On passing both the written and driving test, the full driving licence is issued. Once issued, a driving licence is valid for a period of one to five years depending on which period of time the driver chooses to pay for. On the expiry of the period for which the licence is issued, it will become renewable on the last day of the driver's birth month and will again be valid for the time period for which payment is made. Visitors and non-nationals who are the holders of a valid driver's permit issued in their country of residence or origin are not allowed to drive automatically in Barbados but must go to a police station to have a temporary local driving licence issued. The licence is issued on payment of a fee and the production of the visitor's existing permit.

==== Canada ====
The age to obtain a driver's licence/permis de conduire in Canada varies by province, as do the necessary procedures. The minimum age for obtaining a permit to drive unaccompanied in most provinces is 16. Many driving permits and ID cards display small digits next to each data field. This is required by the American Association of Motor Vehicle Administrators' design standard and has been adopted by many Canadian provinces and territories. The AAMVA standard generally follows part 1 and part 2 of ISO/IEC 18013-1 (ISO compliant driving license). The ISO standard in turn specifies requirements for a card that is aligned with the UN Conventions on Road Traffic, namely the Geneva Convention on Road Traffic and the Vienna Convention on Road Traffic.

==== Costa Rica ====
Every vehicle driver must carry a Licencia de Conducir, which is issued by COSEVI (Consejo de Seguridad Vial) of the ministry of transport and public infrastructure (Ministerio de Obras Públicas y Transporte).

For this permit to be granted there are three needed tests, practical driving (includes driving a car in simulated streets), theoretical driving (a multiple selection written test based on booklet issued by the education department or after taking a special course), and finally a medical test performed by a medical practitioner that tests eyesight, blood pressure and attests the presence of other diseases and behavior of the driver.

Every citizen can solicit a driver's license at age 18, after being issued the first time, the license must be renewed after two years, and every successive occasion after five years. Foreigners may also obtain a drivers' license if they have residency.

Besides this document the driver must carry the national identity card (Cédula de Identidad), however both documents use the same identification number, the national identity card being the basis of the driver's license number.

License classes
License code	Vehicle type	Vehicles allowed
A1	Motorcycle	Up to 125 CC (or 11 KW for electric or hybrid vehicles). Also allows for tri/quad bikes up to 250cc
A2	Motorcycle	Up to 500cc (or 35 KW for electric or hybrid vehicles)
A3	Motorcycle	Unlimited CC or KW
B1	Automobile	Light vehicles of up to 4,000 kg of net weight. Allows for trailers, as long as the sum of the vehicle and trailer combo does not exceed 4,000 kg.
B2	Automobile	Vehicles of up to 8,000 kg of net weight.
B3	Automobile	Unlimited weight class
B4	Automobile	Vehicles of all weight, including articulated vehicles.
C1	Taxi	Only for licensed taxi vehicles.
C2	Autobus	Includes private and public buses.
D1	Tractor	Only wheeled tractors.
D2	Tractor	Includes tracked and wheeled tractors.
D3	Tractor	Includes all forms of vehicles not contemplated by the D1 and D2.
E1	All-vehicles	Includes all vehicles except the ones for public transport and those requiring D class.
E2	All-vehicles	Includes all vehicles except the ones for public transport.

==== El Salvador ====
All driver's licenses are given by the government agency SERTRACEN (Servicios de Tránsito Centroamericanos S.A. de C.V.).

One needs a minimum of 15 years to receive a driver's license (a juvenile license). To get a new license, one needs to pass a vision test, a written test, and a driving test. These tests are given at accredited driving schools. Foreigners with a license from another country can obtain an El Salvador license if they have residency. They will also have to pass a vision test. The driver's license number is the same as the person's Tax ID number.

El Salvador licenses (as well as vehicle circulation cards) contain a chip which can be read by putting the card in a chip reader.

There are several categories of drivers' licenses in El Salvador:

- Juvenil Particular—License for minors, allowing them to drive cars and pickup trucks
- Motociclista—Motorcycle license
- Particular—License for adults, for cars, vans up to 17 passengers, and pickup trucks.
- Liviana—Taxis, Light trucks up to 5 tons, and buses up to 30 passengers.
- Pesada—Buses greater than 30 passengers, and trucks greater than 5 tons.
- Pesada T—Trucks with more than 3 axles.

==== Jamaica ====
A Learner's Permit can be obtained at age 17. After passing both a written and practical test a full "Driver's Licence" can be obtained which will expire on the holder's fifth birthday after the date of issue.

==== Mexico ====
In Mexico, the issue of a licencia para conducir is regulated by each state, and they all have different rules and requirements. However, all state issued driving permits are recognized across Mexico, and International Driving Permits (IDP) are also recognized.

A driver is allowed a learner's permit at the age of 15 (in some states), with a fee of approximately 100 US dollars, a year's validity, and a requirement to drive with an adult at all times. At the age of 16, the fee drops to about 30 US dollars, and a driving permit is issued with some usage restrictions, depending on the state, such as a curfew. Drivers are allowed a full permit when a driver turns 18.

==== Trinidad and Tobago ====
In Trinidad and Tobago, a Learner's Permit can be obtained from age 17. Driver's Permits are issued by the Licensing Authority, which is governed by the Ministry of Works and Transport. In order to legally operate any motor vehicle in Trinidad and Tobago, whether it is on or off public-owned-roads, the operator of the motor vehicle must be in possession of a valid Driver's Permit on their person and is legally endorsed for that class of vehicle. Contravening this provision could warrant a fine of up to TT$1,500 and imprisonment.

==== United States ====
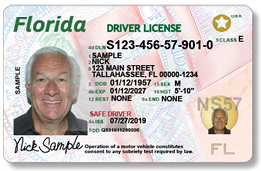
The Florida driving permit and ID card issued since May 2019 displays small digits next to each data field. This is required by the American Association of Motor Vehicle Administrators' design standard and has been adopted by many US states.

Age requirements to receive a restricted driving permit by US state 14 years and 3 months 15 years 15 years and 6 months 16 years 16 years and 3-4 months 16 years and 6 months 17 years

The eligible age to first obtain a driver's license varies substantially from state to state, from 14 years, three months, in South Dakota to 17 in New Jersey. In a majority of states, one can obtain a license that allows driving without adult supervision by age 16, after passing the requisite tests. Since the driver's license is a commonplace document that carries much of the necessary information needed for identification, it has become the primary method of identification in the United States. Many driving permits and ID cards display small digits next to each data field. This is required by the American Association of Motor Vehicle Administrators' design standard and has been adopted by many US states. The AAMVA standard generally follows part 1 and part 2 of ISO/IEC 18013-1 (ISO compliant driving license). The ISO standard in turn specifies requirements for a card that is aligned with the UN Conventions on Road Traffic, namely the Geneva Convention on Road Traffic and the Vienna Convention on Road Traffic.

In the United States, a holder of a driver's license is typically legally allowed to operate a motor vehicle up to 26,000 pounds if no hazardous materials and no more than 16 persons (driver included) are in the vehicle. Most jurisdictions that grant driver's licenses only permit the holder to operate a roadworthy vehicle consisting of four or more wheels. If not, one must get a Grade M license which only allows for one to operate a vehicle with no more than three wheels, such as a tricycle. To operate a two-wheel motorized vehicle with a sustainable speed greater than 30 mph (48 km/h) requires an endorsement on the license, typically after successful completion of a theory (written) and practical test.

On the federal level, motor vehicles with a curb weight of GCWR of 26,001 lb (11,794 kg) or more, a vehicle designed to transport 16 or more passengers (driver included), or a vehicle transporting hazardous materials can only be driven by an operator carrying a Commercial Driver License (Commercial Motor Vehicle Safety Act of 1986). Upon successful completion of theory and practical testing, endorsements can be applied to a CDL to allow legal transport of specialty types of goods:

- T Semi trailer Double or Triple (written test)
- Certain states, such as California, Florida, Michigan, New York, and Illinois prohibit triple trailers statewide.
- A Class A license is required to obtain the T endorsement.
- P Passenger Vehicle (written and driving tests)
- S School Bus (written and driving test, background check, sex offender registry check, and P endorsement)
- N Tank Truck (written test)
- H Hazardous materials (written test and background check through the Transportation Security Administration)
- X Combination of Tank Vehicle and Hazardous Materials (written test)
- W Tow truck. (written test)
- M Motorcycle License (written and practical test)

Various state statutes also mandate that a CDL must be held to operate vehicles not covered by federal statutes.

=== Oceania ===
==== Australia ====
The minimum driving age varies between 16 and 18 years of age in different States and Territories. After the minimum age, a graduated licensing scheme operates, with state variations.

==== Cook Islands ====
A "Cook Islands Driving Licence" (Obverse – called a "License to Drive a Motor Vehicle" on its face) is issued at police headquarters in Avarua on the main island of Rarotonga, on production of a valid permit from the visitor's home country. To use a scooter or motor cycle (the main hire vehicles for tourists) a short test has to be taken by anyone whose home permit is only valid for cars, in which a police officer observes the applicant riding up and down the main street of the capital.

==== New Zealand ====
There are three different types of "Driver Licence" in New Zealand: learners (blue), restricted (orange) and full (green). Learner licences allow the person to drive, with a wide number of restrictions. Restricted licences allow driving alone between the hours of 5am to 10pm, and require the person to be at least 16 years 6 months old. Restricted licence drivers who passed their practical test in a vehicle with an automatic transmission are not allowed to drive vehicles with manual transmission until they have their full licence. Full licences are restricted to those 18 and over, or 17 years 6 months old if an approved advanced driving course has been successfully completed.

Six different classes of vehicle are licensed:

Class number	Vehicle	Requirements for learner licence	Requirements for restricted licence	Requirements for full licence
Class 1	Car	Must be 16 years or over	Must be 16 years 6 months old or over, must have learner licence for at least 6 months	Must be 17 years 6 months old or over. Must have restricted licence for at least 12 months if completed a valid defensive driving course or 18 months without.
Class 2	Medium rigid vehicle	Hold a full "Class 1 Licence" for at least 6 months and pass a theory test	N/A	6 months on the "Class 2 Learner Licence" plus a practical test, or immediately upon passing an approved course
Class 3	Medium combination vehicle	Hold a full "Class 2 Licence" for at least 6 months (under 25) or 3 months (25 and over) then pass a theory test	N/A	6 months on the "Class 3 Learner Licence" plus a practical test, or immediately upon passing an approved course
Class 4	Heavy rigid vehicle	Hold a full "Class 2 Licence" for at least 6 months (under 25) or 3 months (25 and over). No theory test required. Apply and pay the required fee	N/A	6 months on the "Class 4 Learner Licence" plus a practical test, or immediately upon passing an approved course
Class 5	Heavy combination vehicle	Hold a full "Class 4 Licence" for at least 6 months (under 25) or 3 months (25 and over) and pass a theory test	N/A	6 months on the "Class 5 Learner Licence" plus a practical test, or immediately upon passing an approved course
Class 6	Motorcycle	Must be 16 years or over	Must be 16 years 6 months old or over, must have learner licence for at least 6 months	Must be 18 or over and have had a restricted licence for 18 months or must be 17 years 6 months old or over and have had a restricted licence for 12 months if an approved advanced driving course is completed

There are also different and separate endorsements that can allow full licence holders of different classes to carry passengers for commercial use (e.g. buses, taxis, Uber), drive specialist equipment (e.g. forklifts, excavators), tow vehicles, carry dangerous goods, instruct other drivers or conduct driving tests.

=== South America ===
==== Peru ====
Peru recognizes the Inter-American Driving Permit.

The minimum age for a driving license is 18 years old. It is obtained via a test in a car, a computer and the applicant must present a vision test which says they are permitted to drive

==== Venezuela ====
In Venezuela, there are four categories of driving licenses:

Second Degree License (Motorcycles): to 16 years old persons (Type "A", for motorcycles less than 150 cm3 engine capacity) and to 18 years old persons (Type "B", to drive motorcycles of any engine capacity).

Third Degree License (motor vehicles for the private transportation of persons, with a capacity of up to nine seats, including that of the driver; vehicles destined to the transport of load, whose maximum weight does not exceed two thousand five hundred kilograms): Type "A", to people over sixteen years and under eighteen, subject to the special legal regime; Type "B", to persons over eighteen years of age.

Fourth and Fifth Degree Licenses: To persons over 21 years of age to drive vehicles with a capacity of up to nine seats destined for public transport of passengers and cargo vehicles, whose maximum weight does not exceed six thousand kilograms. Persons over twenty-five years old, to drive all types of vehicles whatever their capacity or use.

== Organ donations ==
Licensing departments in many countries add an organ donation option on application forms. Sometimes a small picture of a heart or the term Organ Donor is printed on the driving permit, to indicate the holder's agreement to donate their organs in case of sudden death, such as after a collision.

In the United States, this is governed by the Uniform Anatomical Gift Act. In New Zealand and Ireland, willingness to donate organs for transplant is also listed on driving permits. In Australia, the system of notating organ donation requests on permits was replaced in July 2005 with a national registration system and the issue of special cards. In Great Britain (England, Wales and Scotland), code "115" is printed on the reverse of their driving permit to indicate that details are on the National Health Service (NHS) Organ Donor Register.

== International and interstate considerations ==
Many groupings of countries have agreed to recognize driving permits issued by the authorities of any of their members. Examples include the European Union (EU), the Association of Southeast Asian Nations (ASEAN) and the Cooperation Council for the Arab States of the Gulf (GCC), where holders of permits issued by any member state can drive in all member states. Most countries worldwide will also recognize the permits of citizens of foreign states wishing to drive as visitors. All EU member countries now issue permits in a standard format, regardless of the language of the permit.

The International Driving Permit (IDP) (sometimes erroneously called the International Driver's License) is a booklet which is an authorized translation of a driver's home permit into up to ten languages (including languages with non-Latin scripts such as Arabic, Chinese, Greek, Japanese and Russian). In many cases, it is obtained from a motoring organization such as the Automobile Association or the equivalent in the driver's home country. In other cases, it is delivered by the same government services that deliver ordinary permits. The IDP has no validity except when used in conjunction with the driver's own domestic permit. The existence of the IDP is necessitated by many countries refusing to recognize driving permits written in foreign languages without accompanying certified translations.

Temporary visitors from the United States to France (less than 90 days) are permitted to drive with a valid US state driver's license. In addition to holding a US driver's license, visitors are advised (but not required) to carry an International Driving permit, or attach a French translation to their US state driver's license.

China, at present, does not recognize IDPs and requires drivers to obtain an additional Chinese licence before being officially allowed on all roads. Holders of foreign permits are exempt from certain requirements when obtaining a Chinese permit.

A minimum driving age often exists regardless of possession of a foreign permit; an American cannot drive below the local minimum age in Europe, nor can a 17-year-old Briton drive in mainland Europe where the minimum age is 18.

Many countries have established a driver's license exchange arrangement after reviews of the foreign jurisdiction's licensing processes. Where standards in the other jurisdiction are comparable in areas such as medical standards, minimum driving age, and knowledge and road testing, an exchange of the foreign jurisdiction's license may occur. This may also be called Driver's License Reciprocity.

=== Issues when moving permanently from one jurisdiction to another ===
Most issuing authorities require holders of foreign permits taking up residence in their jurisdiction to obtain a local driving permit within a limited time, typically 6 months or 1 year. In most cases, the driver must follow the full local procedure for obtaining a permit, but some jurisdictions have mutual recognition agreements and will exchange the foreign permit for a local one without the need to undertake an additional driving test.

An exception is the EU, where permits do not need to be exchanged since the introduction of the "common EU driving licence scheme".

==== Australia ====
Each state in Australia has different rules for how long a visitor can drive on an international license or a license from a different state. For example, New South Wales allows three months whereas Victoria allows six months. Drivers that move permanently to another state must change their license to a local state license within the prescribed time. This is usually free. In some states, drivers with a full New Zealand driver licence are treated as interstate drivers.

==== Canada ====
British Columbia has a reciprocal licence exchange scheme with other Canadian provinces and territories as well as other countries provided the licence is still valid or has been expired for less than three years.

In Ontario, holders of a (7L) licence, which is given out by British Columbia, Alberta and Saskatchewan, are not restricted to being accompanied by a supervisor while driving in Ontario, until they get their full permit at the age of 18. Ontario has a reciprocal permit exchange scheme for Canadian provinces and territories, Canadian Forces Europe, and some other countries.

Quebec has a reciprocal licence exchange scheme for Canadian provinces and territories, Canadian Forces Europe, American states and other countries.

==== France ====
US state driver's licenses can be exchanged from the 18 states below during the first year of legal residence in France: Arkansas, Colorado, Connecticut, Delaware, Florida, Illinois, Iowa, Maryland, Massachusetts, Michigan, New Hampshire, Ohio, Oklahoma, Pennsylvania, South Carolina, Texas, Virginia and Wisconsin.

If you are a resident of France (holder of a carte de séjour or carte de résidence), you may drive in France with a valid US state driver's license for a one-year recognition period, beginning on the date of validity of the first carte de séjour (exception for students who are allowed to use their driver's license for the duration of their studies). In addition to having a US state driver's license, residents are also required to attach a French translation done by a sworn translator, or expert traducteur or traducteur assermenté.

==== Germany ====
The US Embassy in Berlin, supported by the US Chamber of Commerce in Germany, continues to actively press all US states, territories, and Washington, D.C. to reach an agreement on the reciprocal recognition of driver's licenses with Germany, essentially a waiver of testing requirements.

If approved, drivers from Alabama, Arizona, Arkansas, Colorado, Delaware, Idaho, Illinois, Iowa, Kansas, Kentucky, Louisiana, Massachusetts, Maryland, Michigan, New Mexico, Ohio, Oklahoma, Pennsylvania, Puerto Rico, South Carolina, South Dakota, Texas, Utah, Virginia, West Virginia, Washington state, Wisconsin, and Wyoming will be exempted from both the road and written driving tests.

If approved, drivers from Connecticut, District of Columbia, Florida, Indiana, Minnesota, Mississippi, Missouri, Nebraska, North Carolina, Oregon, Tennessee will be exempted from the road tests only.

==== Hong Kong ====
As stated on the application form for direct issue of a full Hong Kong driving licence (Rev. 11/2008), when a person has documentary evidence to the Commissioner for Transport's satisfaction that all of the following apply, the person is eligible for direct issue of a Hong Kong permit:

- The person has held a full driving licence (not an International Driving Permit) for three years issued by one of the following countries or territories: Australia, Austria, Bangladesh, Belgium, Bermuda, Canada, China, Denmark, Finland, France, Germany, Guernsey, Iceland, India, Ireland, the Isle of Man, Israel, Italy, Japan, Jersey, Luxembourg, Macao, Malaysia, Namibia, the Netherlands, New Zealand, Nigeria, Norway, Pakistan, Portugal, Singapore, South Africa, South Korea, Spain, Sweden, Switzerland, Taiwan, the United Kingdom, or the United States.
- The driving entitlement(s) for which one is applying must be equivalent to the class(es) which are authorized by the issuing country or place; and
- The driving licence was obtained by passing the relevant driving test(s) in the issuing country or territory; and
- Satisfies one of the three requirements below:
- The licence was originally issued on any date during a period of residence of not less than 6 months in the country or place of issue (entry and departure stamps on a passport, school transcript or employer's testimonial with employment period specified are accepted as proof); or
- The licence has been issued for not less than 5 years immediately before the application; or
- Hold a passport or an equivalent travel document of the country or territory in which the license was issued.

==== Singapore ====
A foreigner 18 years of age or older and holding a Work Pass/Dependent Pass/Student Pass may drive in Singapore with a valid class 3, 3A or 2B foreign permit, for a period of not more than 12 months. A Singaporean driving licence is required after 12 months. Those on short term social visits may drive with their foreign permit for up to 12 months each time they enter into Singapore. For licences not written in the English language, an International Driving Permit or translation is required.

Foreign licence conversion is only granted for class 2B and class 3 qualified driving licences.

In order to convert a foreign permit to a Singapore driving licence, passing the Basic Theory Test (BTT) is required. Overseas theory test results are not admissible for consideration.

==== Sweden ====
Residents in Sweden having a foreign permit can exchange it for a Swedish licence, if it is from an EEA country, Switzerland or Japan. Foreign licences are valid if the holder has not been living in Sweden for more than a year (and some more requirements).

==== United Kingdom ====
===== Great Britain =====
The Driver and Vehicle Licensing Agency (DVLA), which licenses drivers in Great Britain (England, Scotland and Wales) but not Northern Ireland, exchanges full driving permits issued by:

- Northern Ireland. Although part of the UK, driving licences are issued by the Driver and Vehicle Agency (DVA or DVANI) in Northern Ireland,
- Countries within the EEA and Switzerland,
- The British Crown dependencies of Guernsey, Jersey and the Isle of Man,
- Gibraltar and other British Overseas Territories,
- Australia, Barbados, the Faroe Islands, Hong Kong, Japan, Monaco, New Zealand, Singapore, South Korea, South Africa, and Zimbabwe,
- Canada (by default, Canadian driver's licences will only be exchanged for licences to drive automatic transmission cars, unless documentary evidence is provided that a manual gearbox (shift) test was passed in Canada).

===== Northern Ireland =====
The Driver & Vehicle Agency (DVA), which licenses drivers in Northern Ireland, exchanges full driving permits issued by:

- Great Britain (England, Scotland and Wales). Although part of the UK, driving licences are issued by the Driver and Vehicle Licensing Agency (DVLA) in these 3 constituent countries.
- Countries within the EEA and Switzerland
- The British Crown dependencies of Guernsey, Jersey and the Isle of Man
- Gibraltar and other British Overseas Territories
- Australia, Barbados, Faroe Islands, Hong Kong, Japan, Monaco, New Zealand, Singapore, South Korea, South Africa, and Zimbabwe (only car and motorcycle licences)
- Canada (only car and motorcycle licences; by default, Canadian driver's licences will only be exchanged for licences to drive automatic transmission cars, unless documentary evidence is provided that a manual gearbox (shift) test was passed in Canada).

==== United States ====
A driver's license from any US state is valid for temporary use in any other US state, although most states require that a person have a license issued by their state of primary residence. Most states allow residents to convert an out-of-state license to an in-state license without any additional written or road tests.

Delaware has a reciprocal license exchange for Germany, France, and Taiwan to allow holders of those licenses to obtain a Delaware license without any additional written or road tests.

A District of Columbia driver's license may be obtained while maintaining an out-of-country driver's license. D.C. driver's licenses may vary for non-US citizens, depending on visa classification. The written test is required for non-US citizens who possess an out-of-country driver's license.

Florida has a reciprocal license agreement with South Korea, allowing South Korean licenses to be exchanged for a Florida license, and vice versa, without taking a written or road test.

A New York State driver's license may be obtained by a resident of another country. If the driver has a driver's license from any nation except Canada, they must pass a written test, complete a 5-hour pre-licensing course, and pass a road test to qualify for a driver's license.

Texas allows new residents to drive on another state's license due up to 90 days provided it is valid and not expired. Texas does not require drivers from Canada, France, Germany, or Taiwan to take the written and practical tests, but drivers must agree to a vision test.

Washington state has a reciprocal license exchange, allowing holders of valid licenses from any other US state, British Columbia, Germany, Japan, South Korea, and Taiwan to exchange their license for a Washington State license without taking any written or road tests.

Virginia has a reciprocal agreement with Canada, France, and Germany. The knowledge and skills tests may be waived if the driver meets residency and other requirements.

== See also ==
- Commercial driver's license
- Driver's education
- Learner's permit
- International Driving Permit
- Mobile driver's license
- Pilot licensing and certification
- Prawo Jazdy (alleged criminal)
- Road traffic safety
- Vehicle category
- Vehicle licence
- List of minimum driving ages
