= Inter-American Driving Permit =

The Inter-American Driving Permit (IADP) is an identity document that licenses the holder to drive a private motor vehicle in another nation when accompanied by a valid license from their home country. The IADP is similar to the International Driving Permit (IDP), but is specific to drivers in North, Central, and South America. To be eligible for an IADP, one must first have a valid driver's license. The IADP might not be issued by all countries in the Americas, due to most of them being parties of the 1949 Geneva Convention or the 1968 Vienna Convention, thus most only issue the IDP.

== IADP recognition ==
The following countries recognize the Inter-American Driving Permit:

- Argentina
- Bolivia
- Chile
- Colombia
- Costa Rica
- Dominican Republic
- Ecuador
- El Salvador
- Guatemala
- Haiti
- Honduras
- Mexico
- Nicaragua
- Paraguay
- Peru
- Saint Kitts and Nevis
- Trinidad and Tobago
- United States
- Venezuela

It is a widespread misconception in the US, that can be seen on US federal government websites, state government websites, and AAA, that Brazil and Uruguay recognize the IADP but not the IDP. The correct information is that both signed the 1968 Vienna Convention, making them both parties that lawfully recognize IDP and do not issue the IADP since the signing of the 1968 Vienna Convention, due to it having terminated and replaced previous signed agreements. The confusion and misinformation probably arose from neither of those countries being party of the 1949 Geneva Convention, whereas US signed the 1949 Geneva Convention but not the 1968 Vienna Convention. Both the 1949 Geneva Convention and the 1968 Vienna Convention terminated and replaced the Convention on the Regulation of Inter-American Automotive Traffic, which created the IADP.
