= Enterprise software =

Software targeted towards corporations/organisations

Enterprise software, also known as enterprise application software (EAS), is computer software that has been specially developed or adapted to meet the complex requirements of larger organizations. Enterprise software is an integral part of a computer-based information system, handling a number of business operations, for example to enhance business and management reporting tasks, or support production operations and back office functions. Enterprise systems must process information at a relatively high speed.

Services provided by enterprise software are typically business-oriented tools. As companies and other organizations have similar departments and systems, enterprise software is often available as a suite of customizable programs. Function-specific enterprise software uses include database management, customer relationship management, supply chain management and business process management.

== Definitions and industry ==
The term enterprise software is used in industry, and business research publications, but is not common in computer science. The term was widely popularized in the early 1990s by major software vendors in conjunction with licensing deals with the show Star Trek. In academic literature, no coherent definition can be found. The computer historian Martin Campbell-Kelly contemplated in 2003 that the growth of the corporate software industry is not well understood. Enterprise application software (EAS) is recognized among academics as enterprise software components and modules which support only a particular business function. These EAS components and modules can interoperate, so that cross-functional or inter-organizational enterprise systems can be built up. In this context the industry may speak of middleware. Software that is primarily sold to consumers, is not called enterprise software.

According to Martin Fowler, "Enterprise applications are about the display, manipulation, and storage of large amounts of often complex data and the support or automation of business processes with that data."

Enterprise application software is application software that performs business functions such as order processing, procurement, production scheduling, customer information management, energy management, and accounting.

== Enterprise systems ==
Enterprise system
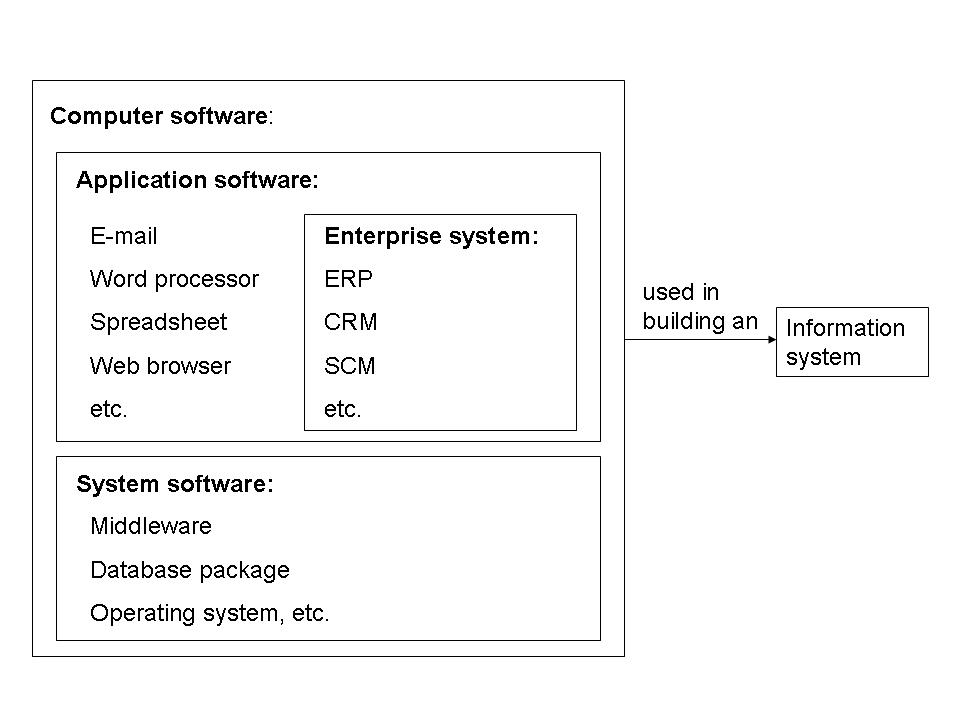
- Image describing what an enterprise system is
- Type: software package

Enterprise systems (ES) are large-scale enterprise software packages which support a range of business processes, information flows, reporting, and data analytics in complex organizations. While ES are generally packaged enterprise application software (PEAS) systems, they can also be bespoke, custom-developed systems created to support a specific organization's needs. Types of enterprise system include:

- enterprise resources planning (ERP) systems,
- enterprise planning systems, and
- customer relationship management software.

Although data warehousing or business intelligence systems are enterprise-wide packaged application software often sold by ES vendors, since they do not directly support execution of business processes, they are often excluded from the term.

Enterprise systems are built on software platforms, such as SAP's NetWeaver and Oracle's Fusion, and databases.

From a hardware perspective, enterprise systems are the servers, storage and associated software that large businesses use as the foundation for their IT infrastructure. These systems are designed to manage large volumes of critical data and thus are typically designed to provide high levels of transaction performance and data security.

The "seemingly boundless complexity" of enterprise systems has been criticised, and arguments maintained for deploying discrete systems for specific business tasks. Cynthia Rettig, an American businesswoman, has argued that "the concept of a single monolithic system [has] failed for many companies".

== Types ==
Enterprise software can be categorized by business function. Each type of enterprise application can be considered a "system" due to the integration with a firm's business processes. Categories of enterprise software may overlap due to this systemic interpretation. For example, IBM's business intelligence platform (Cognos), integrates with a predictive analytics platform (SPSS) and can obtain records from its database packages (Infosphere, DB2).

Certain industry-standard product categories have emerged, and these are shown below:

- Business intelligence (BI)
- Business Process Management (BPM)
- Content Management System (CMS)
- Customer Relationship Management (CRM)
- Database Management System (DBMS) - such as Master Data Management (MDM) and Data Warehousing (DW, DWH or EDW)
- Enterprise Resource Planning (ERP)
- Enterprise Asset Management (EAM)
- Human Resource Management (HRM)
- Knowledge Management (KM)
- Low-code Development Platforms (LCDP)
- Product Data Management (PDM)
- Product Information Management (PIM)
- Product Lifecycle Management (PLM)
- Supply Chain Management (SCM)
- Software Configuration Management (SCM) - such as Version Control System (VCS)
- Networking and Information Security
  - Intrusion Detection Prevention (IDS) - and by extension Intrusion Prevention System (IPS)
  - Software Defined Networking (SDN) - including SD-WAN
  - Security Information Event Management (SIEM) - which can combine Security Information Management (SIM) and Security Event Management (SEM).

Other types of software which do not fit into well-known standard categories, including backup software, billing management, and accounting software. Enterprise contract management software is used to bring all of an organisation's contractual commitments into a single system for holistic management and to avoid the variability and inefficiency inherent in manual contracting processes.

== See also ==
- Application Release Automation Software
- Business informatics
- Business software
- Enterprise architecture
- Enterprise forms automation
- Enterprise planning system
- Global Information Network Architecture
- IBM Smarter Computing
- Identity management
- Identity management system
- Information technology management
- Integrated business planning
- Management information system
- Operational risk management
- Retail software
- Strategic information system
