= Enterprise forms automation =

Enterprise forms automation is a company-wide computer system or set of systems for managing, distributing, completing, and processing paper-based forms, applications, surveys, contracts, and other documents. It plays a vital role in the concept of a paperless office.

JetForm Corporation first used the term "enterprise forms automation" in the mid 1990s to describe their solution to automating paperwork. This process was later acquired by Adobe Systems, and is now part of the Adobe LiveCycle suite of products. In 2004, Efficient Technology Inc, became the first company to apply this term to software as a service.

Enterprise forms automation refers to the automation of paper-based processes that specifically rely on documents (forms, applications, etc.) that retain a paper-based look and experience, even if not printed out for interaction. To be considered an 'enterprise forms automation' solution, a system must meet enterprise software requirements, and specifically focus on automating paperwork and paper-based forms.

== Impact ==
Organizations implement enterprise software solutions to automate major functions and large processes, as these areas offer the greatest cost savings compared to smaller projects. Enterprise-level implementations often cost over $100,000 and therefore take many months to produce cost savings. As such, organizations ignore automating smaller functions, due to the lack of immediate financial benefit or cost savings. As functions become more automated while software costs for enterprise systems drop in price, organizations begin automating lower-level functions to become more efficient. In addition, through the advent of standards like Adobe's PDF model and service models like Quik!, companies seek to automate the filling out of forms via enterprise forms automation solutions.

Automating forms also has a positive 'green' impact on the environment. To reduce waste and carbon emissions, companies seek ways to eliminate paper. An enterprise forms automation system can eliminate paper entirely, or significantly reduce how much paper a company uses—also reducing shipping costs, and printing and storage costs of paper forms. In addition, automating paper-based processes greatly speeds up the time it takes to perform transactions, which results in fewer errors, rejections, and revisions—and frees up time spent by users on manual labor.

== Implementation ==
=== DMS ===
Modern implementation of the paperless office concept has two main focuses: creating documents and managing documents. Since major systems have already displaced paper altogether (e.g., enterprise resource planning, customer relationship management, accounting software, etc.), paper that remains in use is largely generated by processes that capture data, generate reports, and distribute communications. As software and computers have evolved, the first problem addressed has been management of existing and legacy documents through document management systems.

Document management and archiving systems do offer some form automation functions. Typically, the point at which document management systems start working with a document is when the document is scanned or sent into the system. Many document management systems can read documents via optical character recognition (OCR) and use that data within the document management system. While this technology is essential to a paperless office it does not address the processes that generate paper in the first place.

The ultimate step towards eliminating paper is to change the way that documents are created. In 1993 Adobe Systems introduced the Portable Document Format (PDF) to facilitate the exchange of documents in a universal manner across most computer platforms. This format has laid the foundation for creating, transporting, working on, and archiving electronic documents—and in 2008 became an ISO standard. In addition, the PDF model established a method for automating forms that can be pre-filled with existing data and manually entered on a PC screen—which can reduce or eliminate printed forms.+

=== Implementation tools ===
A typical enterprise forms automation implementation typically combines:

- A library of electronic versions of paper-based documents (PDF format or comparable format)
- Data store of existing data or web pages that collect data to fill onto forms
- Software that pre-fills existing data from databases and data stores onto electronic forms
- Software that saves forms in process or partially completed
- Software that captures and translates electronic form data
- Workflow systems that manage interaction with forms and data
- Two-way messaging between forms and systems during submission and validation
- Barcode software that matches images of forms with electronic form data
- Digital signature solutions that capture signatures electronically

=== Implementation challenges ===
The primary challenge to using these technologies is resource planning and implementation costs. However, all necessary technologies have existed since at least 2000. Furthermore, the U.S. Congress signed the Electronic Signatures in Global and National Commerce Act (ESIGN Act) into law, which lets companies accept digital signatures as valid signatures. Even with the law in effect, companies have been slow to adopt such solutions due to the cost and skills required to design, build, and maintain them at reasonable cost.

A secondary challenge is integrating electronic forms into an existing process, whereby existing data stores can be accessed and supplied to and from the forms. While tools to assist with integration exist, most implementations require custom programming for specific forms and data sources.

Many of these challenges are addressed by middleware solutions, technology platforms, and services that connect different systems. Known as Enterprise Application Integration ("EAI"), these solutions have introduced methods for integrating web-based and centrally managed capabilities with legacy systems. Advances in EAI technologies have also simplified the implementation and management of enterprise forms automation.

== See also ==
- Document automation
- Form (document)
