= Form (document) =

Printed record allowing signers to fill out fields

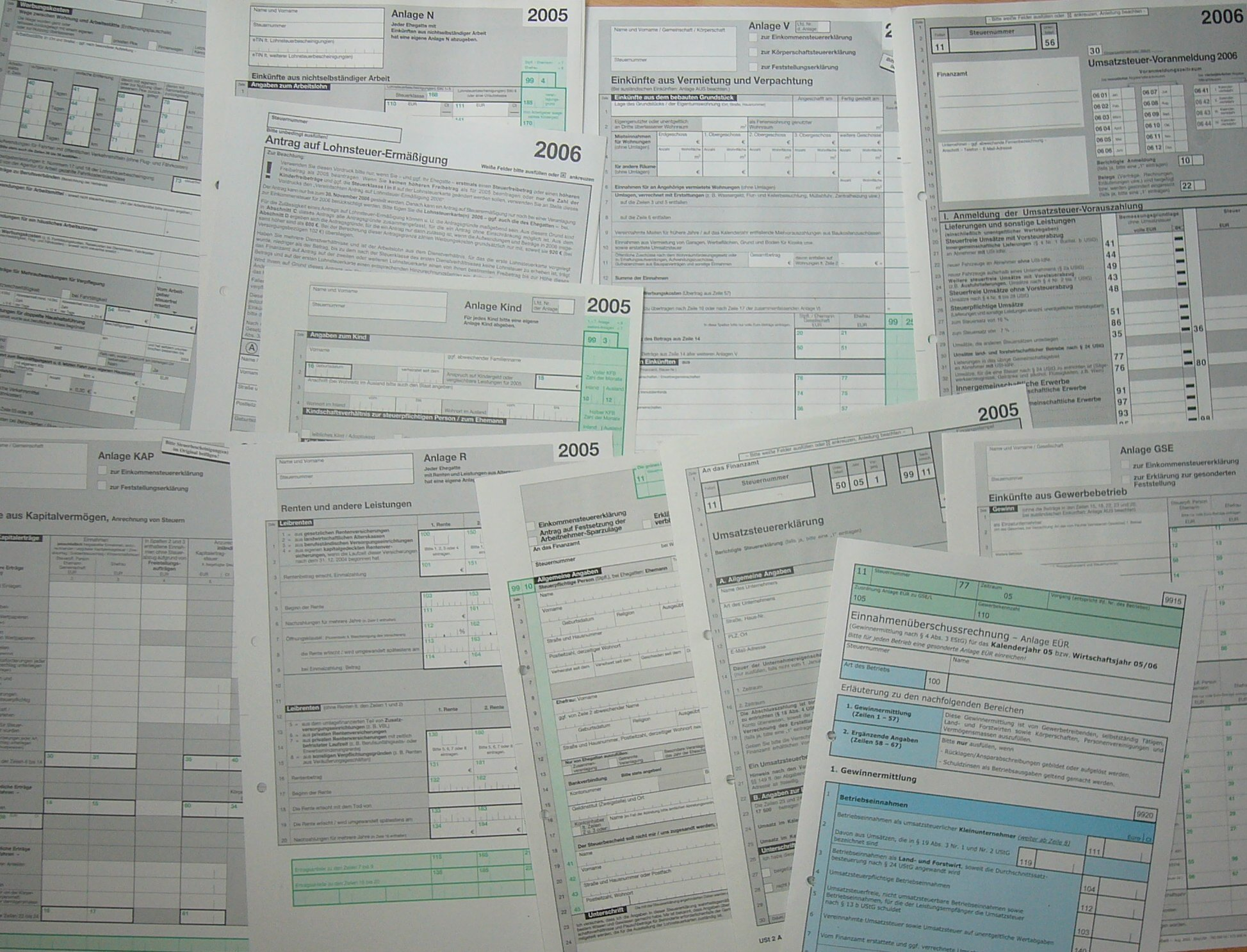
A variety of forms

A form is a document which contains blank spaces (also named fields or placeholders) in which one can write or select an option. Forms can be distributed to several signatories at once, or made available on demand. Before being filled out, each copy of a form is usually identical, except, possibly, for a serial number. A form allows an organisation to collect a uniform set of data from many parties in a consistent manner.

Forms, when completed, vary in their purpose; for example, a form might be a statement, a request, or an order. A cheque may also be considered a form. In addition, there are several forms for taxes. An example is a tax return; filling one out is required in order for the amount of tax one owes to be determined. A form may also be a request for a tax refund.

Forms may be filled out in duplicate (or triplicate, meaning three times) when the information gathered on the form needs to be distributed to several departments within an organisation. This can be done using carbon paper.

== History ==
Forms have existed for a significant amount of time, with historians of law having discovered preprinted legal forms from the early 19th century that greatly simplified the task of drafting complaints and various other legal pleadings.

== Advantages ==
Advantages of forms include the following:

- One has to write less (while the printing is almost universally done in some automatic way).
- One is told or reminded what information has to be supplied.
- There is uniformity, for convenience in processing.
- Information is collected in writing and so can be reexamined later (the form can also include a signature field to allow someone to take responsibility for the accuracy of the information provided).
- Simpler tasks, such as collecting or distributing data, can be separated in the workflow from more skilled processes, such as making decisions. Issuing and processing the forms may then be done by less skilled staff, or by a computer. The de-skilled task becomes issuing or completing the appropriate form for the circumstances, and then passing it on to the next step in the workflow. This might reduce costs and increase the volume of work that can be handled.

A form on a computer allows for conveniently typing in the variable parts (the input data). It can also ensure that all placeholders are filled in properly.

== Form structure ==
Like a usual document, a form typically contains fixed content. It also contains some placeholders which are meant to be filled in. Blank forms are generally not copyrightable in the US.

=== Frame and fixed content ===
The frame is the part of the document that never changes. It usually contains a title and textual instructions.

=== Placeholders ===
Placeholders, or fields, are boxes or spaces where one can write or type in order to fill out the form.

== See also ==
- Database
- Questionnaire
- XForms
- Form (web)
- Forms processing
- Oracle Forms
- Master-detail
- Enterprise forms automation
