= Electronic visa =

Digital travel document for entry into a country

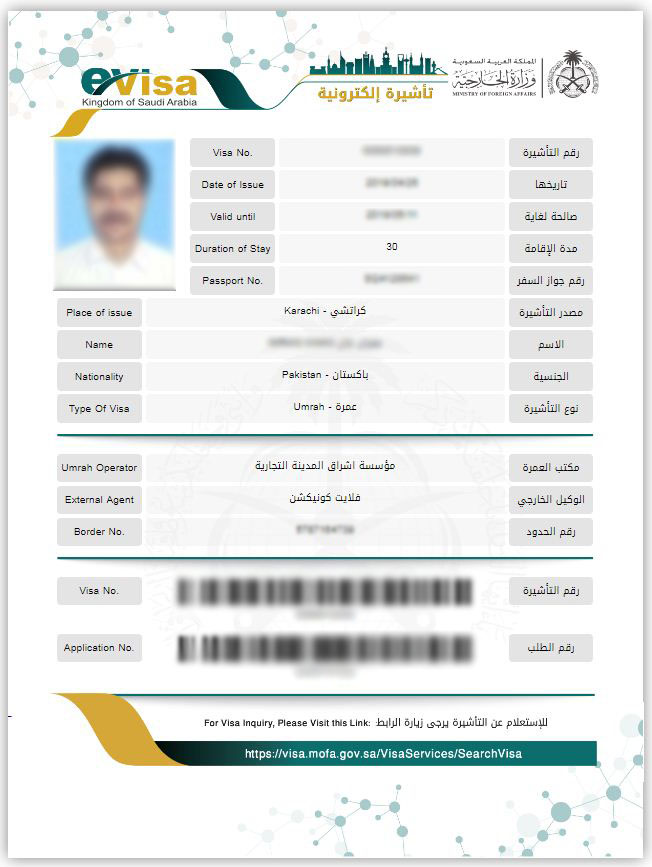
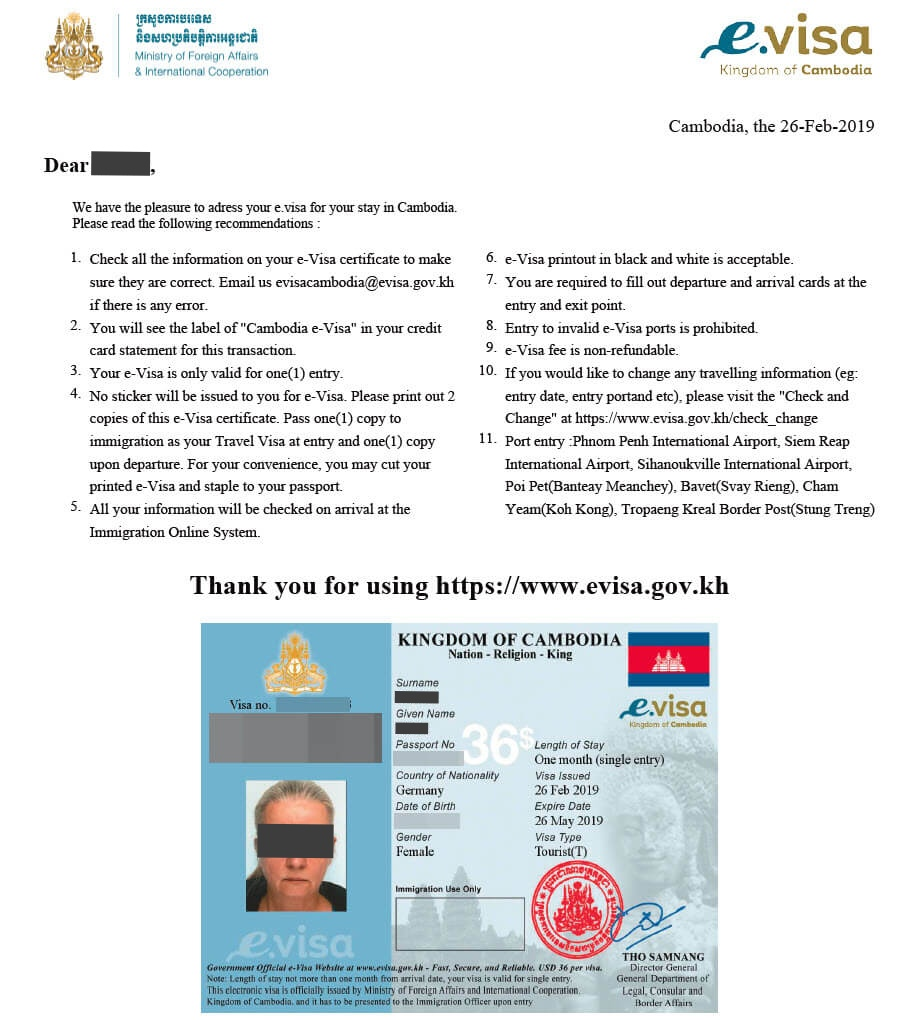
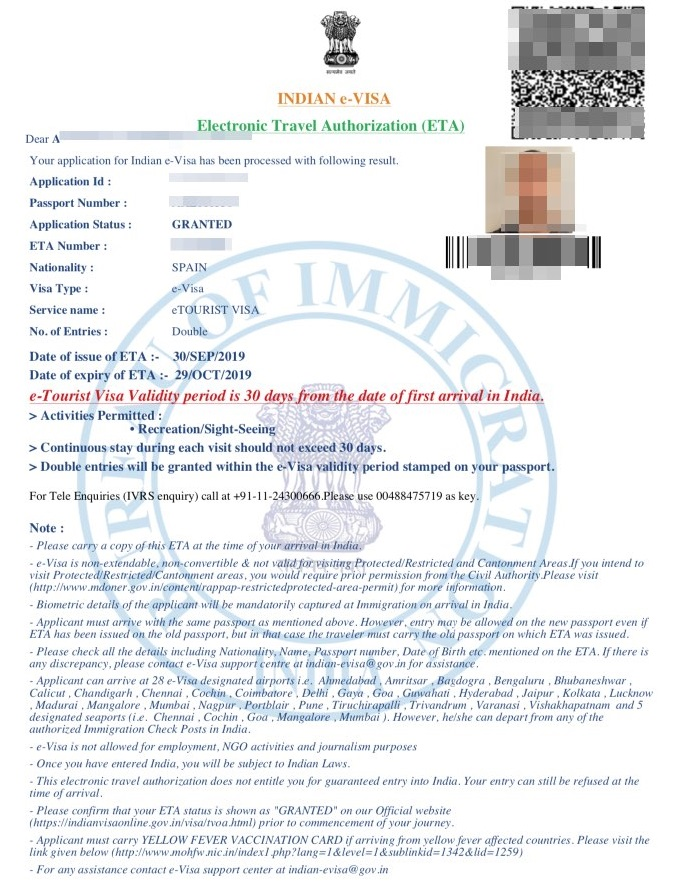
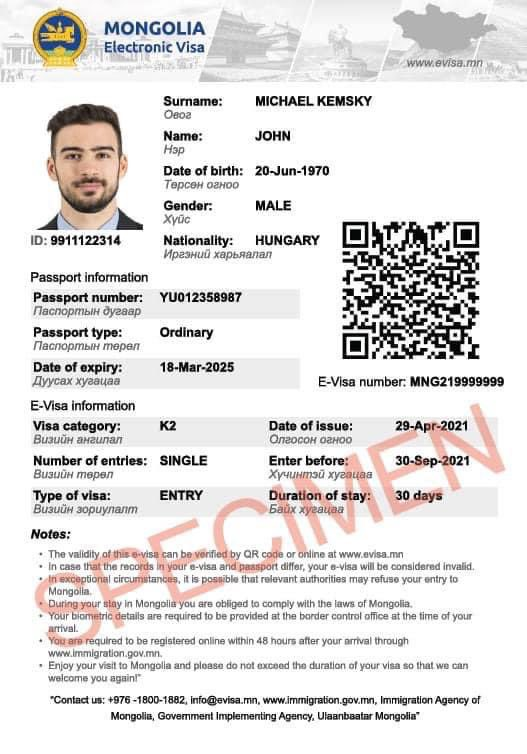
Confirmation of electronic visa approval by country. From clockwise: Saudi Arabia, Cambodia, India, Mongolia.

An electronic visa (E-Visa) and an electronic travel authorization (ETA, also styled eTA) are online systems established by countries that affirm the eligibility of a foreign national to travel to their country under their immigration laws. They confirm that the visitor meets the country's conditions for entry.

Depending on a country's visa category and intention of travel, these systems are a midway point between countries allowing a foreign national to travel to their country unconditionally without a visa, or, countries that require a foreign national to attend an interview at an embassy or consulate to obtain a traditional paper visa in advance before traveling to their country.

Beginning in the 2000s, many countries introduced online systems to issue visas or travel authorizations in electronic form, as an alternative to a traditional paper visa—particularly in the case of ETAs where a bilateral visa waiver program is in place but the receiving country requires background checks to confirm that the visitor meets the conditions of the program. These online systems were established mainly to streamline travel by short-term visitors and tourists from a limited set of countries.

== Issuance ==
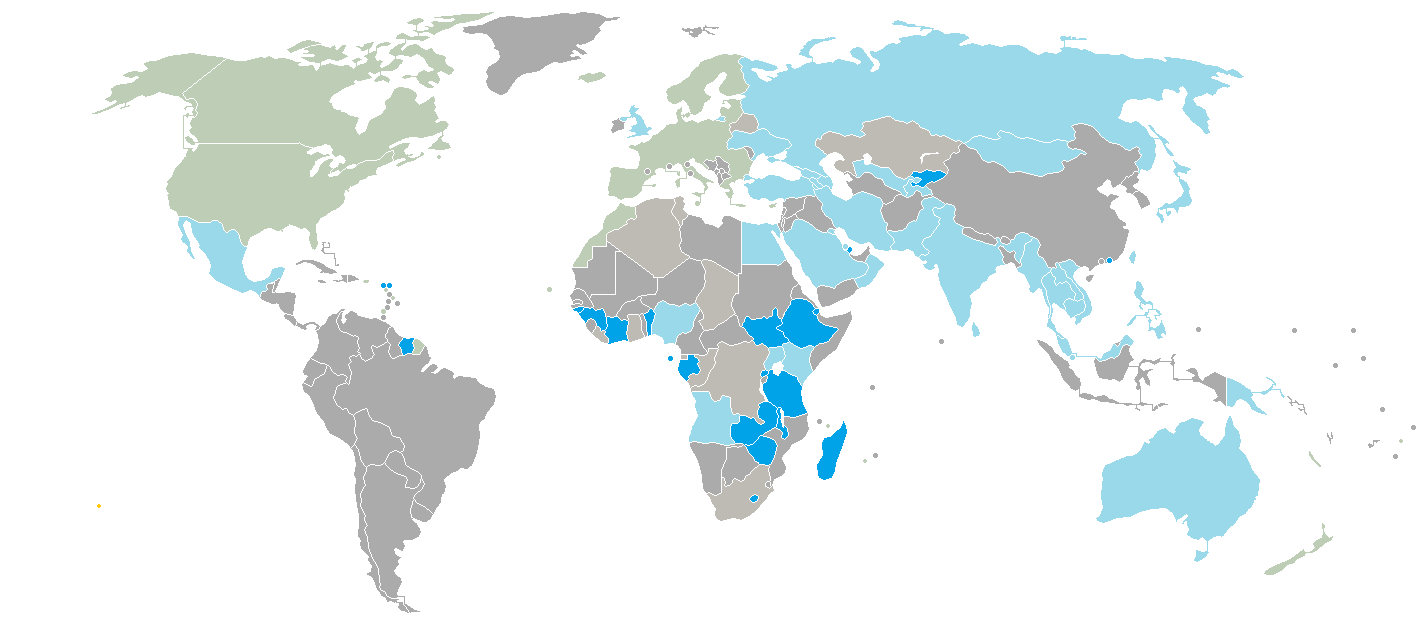
Electronic visas Countries granting electronic visas/ETA universally Countries granting electronic visas/ETA to select nationalities Countries requiring electronic registration from most visa exempt visitors (excluding Australian eVisitor) Countries that plan to introduce eVisas in the future Countries without electronic visas facilities

Depending on the traveler and country of issuance, electronic visas are either issued within minutes, or can take many days. Countries that issue electronic visas conduct initial background checks on all applicants, which include an Interpol database check.

Electronic visas can expire, depending on the country of issuance.

An electronic visa (e-Visa or eVisa) or Electronic travel authorization (or ETA) is stored in a computer and is linked to the passport number so no label, sticker, or stamp is placed in the passport before travel. The application is done over the internet, and the receipt acts as a visa, which can be printed or stored on a mobile device.

== Usage ==
The following jurisdictions require certain categories of international travellers to hold an ETA or e-visa to clear border controls upon arrival

=== Africa ===
- East African Community: From February 2014, Kenya, Rwanda and Uganda issue an East African Tourist Visa. The visa costs 100 USD and has no restrictions on nationality. It is a non-extendable multiple-entry 90-day visa that has to be first used to enter the country that issued it. Like traditional visas, it will be assessed manually and requires some documents such as return ticket and vaccination certificate.
- Somali electronic visa (e-Visa/eTAS) system was launched on August 28, 2025, and became mandatory for all foreign visitors on September 1, 2025
- Kenya: From 1 January 2021, Kenya solely issues e-visas and physical visas are no longer available. Kenya issues both "East African Tourist Visa" and "Electronic Travel Authorisation (eTA)". Both will involve manual assessment which takes around three days, and requires some documents such as return ticket and vaccination certificate. The eTA can be single-entry or multiple-entry.
- Seychelles: Visitors to the Seychelles do not require a visa. However, they need SEBS (Seychelles Electronic Border System). It must need to be fulfilled 30 days before the entry, and pay a fee. Travellers of all ages need to do that, while Seychellois citizens and permanent residents still need the Embarkation Information Form.
- South Africa: Citizens of India, Mexico, Indonesia and China can apply for a ETA. The ETA is usually granted instantly or within 24 hours. Passport holders from eligible countries may stay for up to 90 days per year, with the possibility of extending their stay for an additional 90 days.

=== Americas ===
- Canada: Foreign nationals that are eligible to enter Canada visa-free can do so via land or sea. However, if arriving to Canada by air, they are required to obtain a ETA prior to arrival. Travellers from 14 other countries normally require a visa to enter Canada, but are eligible to apply for an ETA for entry by air if they have held a Canadian visa within the 10 years prior to applying or if they currently hold a valid non-immigrant USvisa. (Note: Eligible jurisdictions are: Antigua and Barbuda; Argentina; Brazil; Costa Rica; Morocco; Panama; Philippines; Saint Kitts and Nevis; Saint Lucia; Saint Vincent and the Grenadines; Seychelles; Thailand; Trinidad and Tobago; Uruguay) Such travellers must still have a valid Canadian visa to enter by land or sea. US citizens and lawful permanent residents and French citizens arriving from Saint Pierre and Miquelon are not required to obtain a ETA when traveling by air.
- United States: Travellers under the Visa Waiver Program are required to obtain permission through the Electronic System for Travel Authorization (ESTA) if arriving in America by any mode of transportation as of 2023. Travellers using a passport issued by the Government of Bermuda to a British Overseas Territories Citizen, entering as a Canadian citizen, or entering under other visa exemption arrangements (such as the Compact of Free Association) are not required to hold an ESTA clearance. Under the US provision titled Visa Waiver Program Improvement and Terrorist Travel Prevention Act of 2015, those who have gone to Iran, Iraq, Libya, North Korea, Somalia, Sudan, Syria or Yemen on or after March 1, 2011, or in Cuba on or after January 12, 2021, or who are dual nationals of Cuba, Iran, Iraq, North Korea, Sudan or Syria, are not eligible to travel under the VWP. Persons who were present in those countries for diplomatic or military purposes in service to a VWP-eligible government are still eligible for ESTA. Those who are ineligible for VWP will need to obtain a visa from a US embassy or consulate.

=== Asia ===
- Hong Kong: Indian nationals, and Taiwanese nationals without a Mainland Travel Permit for Taiwan Residents, are required to complete a pre-arrival registration.
- India: India permits nationals of most jurisdictions to clear border controls using an e-visa. Travellers holding an e-Visa must arrive via 26 designated airports.
- Israel: From 1 January 2025, visitors from visa exempt countries must obtain an electronic travel authorization (ETA-IL) before travelling to Israel. The ETA-IL costs ILS 25 and is valid for 2 years or until the passport expires, whichever occurs first.
- Pakistan: Visitors from several jurisdictions may enter Pakistan for tourism without obtaining a visa in advance provided they hold an ETA.
- Qatar: From 27 September 2017, citizens of all nationalities who hold valid residence permits or visas from either Australia, Canada, New Zealand, the Schengen countries, the United Kingdom, the United States of America or the countries of the Gulf Cooperation Council can obtain an ETA for up to 30 days. The authorization may be extended online for 30 additional days. Qatar introduced an e-Visa system on 23 June 2017. All countries except Egypt, Israel, Kosovo and Palestine that do not qualify for visa on arrival or visa free entry may apply for a tourist visa online through the eVisa system. Visas are issued within four working days if all documents are submitted and are valid for a stay period up to 30 days in Qatar.
- South Korea: eligible visa-free visitors must obtain Korea Electronic Travel Authorization (K-ETA).
- Sri Lanka: Travellers to Sri Lanka must obtain an ETA prior to getting a visa on arrival at the entry port, except for a few countries where the ETA is exempted, and for a few countries where a visa must obtained in advance. Citizens of India, Pakistan, and other countries in the northwestern part of Asia receive discounted ETAs.

=== Europe ===
- Russia: Russia requires ETA from visa exempt countries, and also offers a single entry unified e-visa to visitors from certain countries.
  - e-Visa: Citizens of select countries and territories may obtain a unified e-Visa for 16 days. The unified e-Visa is a single entry visa, which is valid for a period of 60 days from the date of issue, and which allows a period of stay in the Russian Federation of up to 16 days from the date of entry. Electronic visas were first issued in Russia in 2017 to be valid for specific regions, and was expanded to be valid country-wide in 2020, hence being called "unified e-visa".
  - ETA: Starting 30 June 2025, an Electronic Travel Authorization is a mandatory requirement for travelers from visa exemption countries visiting Russia. Travelers holding ordinary passports from eligible countries and territories must obtain a ETA before their departure to Russia.
- United Kingdom: A British Electronic Travel Authorisation must be obtained for visa-free nationalities. A UK ETA is valid for 2 years, or until the traveler's passport expires.

=== Oceania ===
- Australia: Australia administers two distinct categories of ETA. The Electronic Travel Authority scheme is available to citizens of a variety of North America and Asian countries while the eVisitor scheme provides a similar facility for nationals of the European Union and the European Economic Area.
  - Electronic Travel Authority: Developed in January 1996 and first trialed in Singapore on 11 September 1996 for Singaporean and American passport holders traveling with Qantas and Singapore Airlines. Online applications began in June 2001. The current ETA, introduced on 23 March 2013, replaced older versions (subclass 976, 977, and 956) and allows multiple short-term visits to Australia within a 12-month period for tourism or business. While there is no visa application fee, a AU$20 service charge applies. ETA holders must be free from tuberculosis and have no criminal sentence totaling 12 months or more. It is available to some passport holders from Asia and North America. (Note: Eligible jurisdictions are: Brunei; Canada; Hong Kong; Japan; Malaysia; Singapore; South Korea; United States)
  - eVisitor programme: Allows nationals of the European Union and several other countries to visit Australia under a simplified visa system while maintaining visa reciprocity with the EU. It is available to citizens of 27 EU member states and 9 other countries, permitting multiple visits of up to three months per stay within a 12-month period for tourism or business. The eVisitor is free of charge, but travelers must be tuberculosis-free and have no criminal convictions with a total sentence of 12 months or more. (Note: Holders of the following passports are eligible: European Union; Andorra; Iceland; Liechtenstein; Monaco; Norway; San Marino; Switzerland; United Kingdom^{1}; Vatican City; _{1 – For British passport holders, only British citizens are eligible to apply for eVisitor.})
- New Zealand: New Zealand has required that visa waiver travellers (other than citizens of Australia, members of a visiting force, or individuals associated with a scientific programme or expedition in Antarctica sponsored by a party to the Antarctic Treaty) obtain an Electronic Travel Authority (NZeTA) since 1 October 2019.

These lists are not exhaustive. Some countries may have more detailed classifications of some of these categories reflecting the nuances of their respective geographies, social conditions, economies, international treaties, etc.

=== Summary table ===
Country	Mode	Universal eligibility	VoA alternative	Ref.
Angola	Pre-approval	✗	✗	
Antigua and Barbuda	eVisa	✓	✗	
Armenia	eVisa	✗	✓	
Argentina	eVisa (called ETA)	✗	✗	
Ascension Island	eVisa	✓	✗	
Australia	ETA	✗	✗	
Azerbaijan	eVisa	✗	partial	
Bahrain	eVisa	✗	partial	
Benin	eVisa	✓	✗	
Cambodia	eVisa	✗	✓	
Colombia	eVisa	✓	✗	
Djibouti	eVisa	✓	✓	
Egypt	eVisa	✗	partial	
Ethiopia	eVisa	✓	partial	
Gabon	eVisa	✓	partial	
Georgia	eVisa	✗	✗	
Guinea	eVisa	✓	✗	
Guinea-Bissau	Pre-approval	✓	✓	
Hong Kong	ETA/eVisa	✓	✗	
India	eVisa	✗	partial	
Iran	eVisa	✗	✓	
Israel	ETA	✗	✗	
Ivory Coast	eVisa	✓	✗	
Japan	eVisa	✗	✓	
Kenya	eVisa	✗	✓	
Kuwait	eVisa	✗	✓	
Kyrgyzstan	eVisa	✓	partial	
Laos	eVisa	✗	✓	
Lesotho	eVisa	✓	✗	
Madagascar	eVisa	✓	✓	
Malawi	eVisa	✓	✓	
Malaysia	eVisa	✗	✓	
Mexico	ETA	✗	✗	
Mongolia	Pre-approval	✗	partial	
Montserrat	eVisa	✓	✗	
Morocco	eVisa/ETA	✗	partial	
Myanmar	eVisa	✗	partial	
New Zealand	ETA	✗	✗	
Nigeria	eVisa	✗	partial	
Oman	eVisa	✗	✓	
Pakistan	ETA	✗	✗	
Papua New Guinea	eVisa	✗	✓	
Qatar	eVisa	✓	✓	
Russia	eVisa	✗	✗	
Rwanda	eVisa	✓	✓	
Saint Helena	eVisa	✓	✗	
Saint Kitts and Nevis	eVisa	✓	✗	
São Tomé and Príncipe	eVisa	✓	✗	
Saudi Arabia	eVisa	✗	✓	
Singapore	eVisa	✗	✗	
South Sudan	eVisa	✓	✗	
Sri Lanka	ETA	✗	✓	
Seychelles	ETA	✓	✗	
Suriname	eVisa	✓	✗	
Syria	eVisa	✗	✗	
Taiwan	eVisa	✗	partial	
Tajikistan	eVisa	✗	✗	
Tanzania	eVisa	✓	✓	
Thailand	eVisa/Pre-approval	✓	✓	/
Turkey	eVisa	✗	✗	
Uganda	eVisa	✗	✓	
Ukraine	eVisa	✗	✗	
United Kingdom	ETA	✗	✗	
Uzbekistan	eVisa	✗	✗	
Vietnam	eVisa	✓	✓	
Zambia	eVisa	✓	partial	
Zimbabwe	eVisa	✓	partial	

== Future introduction ==
Authorities of Brazil, Belarus, Chad, Republic of the Congo, Democratic Republic of the Congo, Equatorial Guinea, Ghana, Kazakhstan, Liberia, South Africa, and Tunisia have announced plans to introduce electronic visas or ETAs in the future.

- European Union and EFTA: planning to introduce the European Travel Information and Authorisation System (ETIAS) for visa-exempt nationals intending to come to the Schengen Area. Implementation has been delayed until 2027. For non-visa-exempt nationals, the EU plans to introduce a unified digital pre-authorization system starting in 2028. (As of January 2026, the Republic of Ireland and Cyprus are not party to this element of the Schengen Agreement and consequently have independent border control systems. Cyprus aims to become a full member in 2027.}
  - (Note: starting on 10 April 2026, the EU introduced its Entry/Exit System, for automatic electronic monitoring and recording of border crossings by third-country nationals (non-EU/EFTA citizens) at all external border crossings of the Schengen Area. This is not an eVisa system.)
- United Kingdom: Rolling out eVisas to replace all physical immigration documents, such as biometric residence permits and visa vignettes on passports. The process was started in 2024, with most visas going electronic in 2025. As this will only apply to visa-required visitors, this is separate to the established ETA system for visa-waived visitors.
- United States: The State Department's Bureau of Consular Affairs is developing and trialling an electronic visa system called Digital Visa Authorization (DVA), envisioned to eventually replace traditional sticker visas on passports. In 2023, this was trialled with K-1 visas issued at the Embassy of the United States, Dublin, Ireland. As this will only apply to visa-required visitors, this is separate to the established ESTA system for visa-waived visitors.
