= Electronic System for Travel Authorization =

Automated system for United States travel eligibility

ESTA

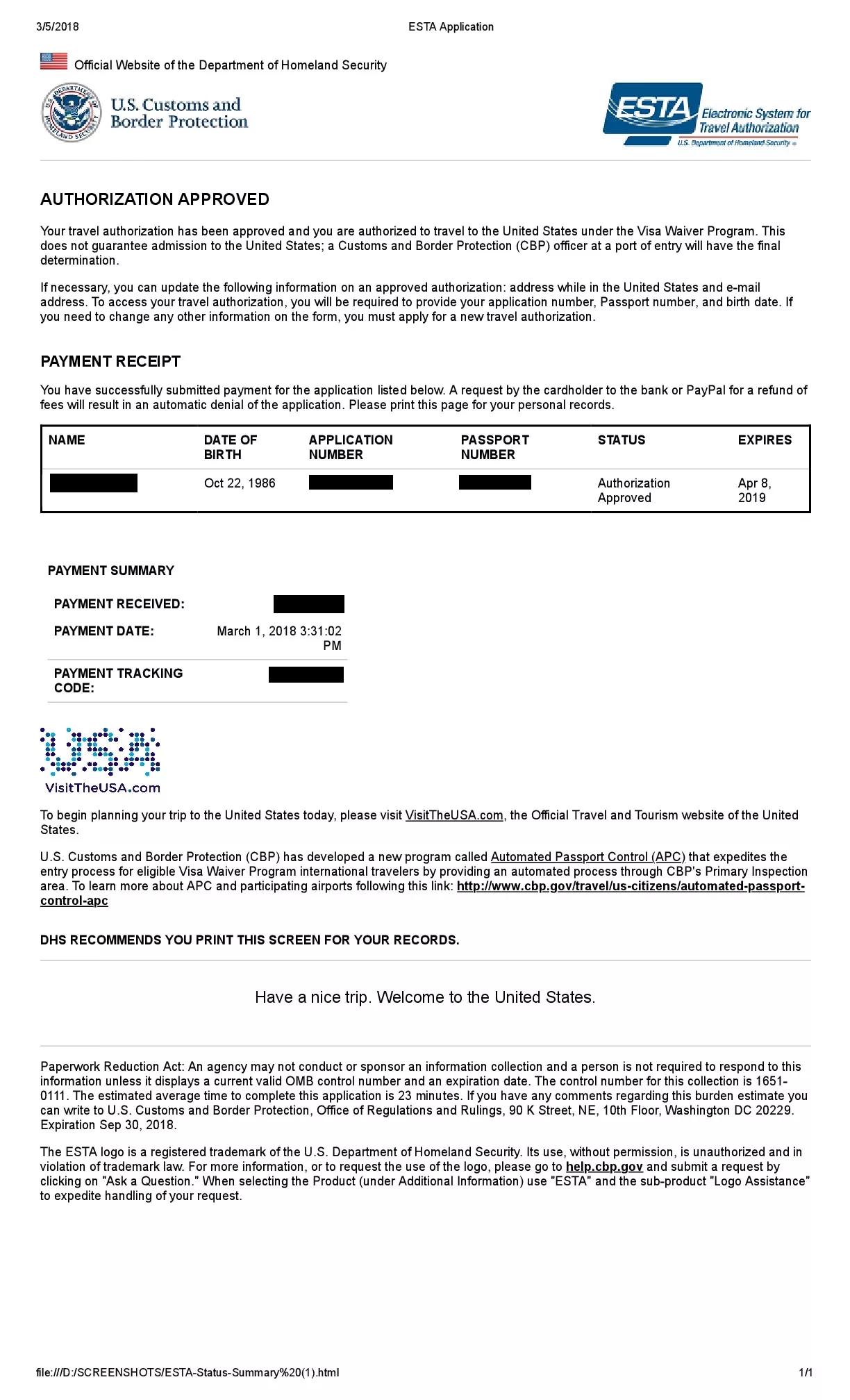
- Record of ESTA approval
- Website: esta.cbp.dhs.gov

The Electronic System for Travel Authorization (ESTA) is an automated electronic travel authorization system that determines the eligibility of visitors to travel to the United States under the Visa Waiver Program (VWP). ESTA was mandated by the Implementing Recommendations of the 9/11 Commission Act of 2007. ESTA only authorizes travel to a U.S. airport, border, or port of entry, but admissibility into the United States is determined by a U.S. Customs and Border Protection (CBP) officer upon arrival. The ESTA application collects biographic information and answers to VWP eligibility questions.

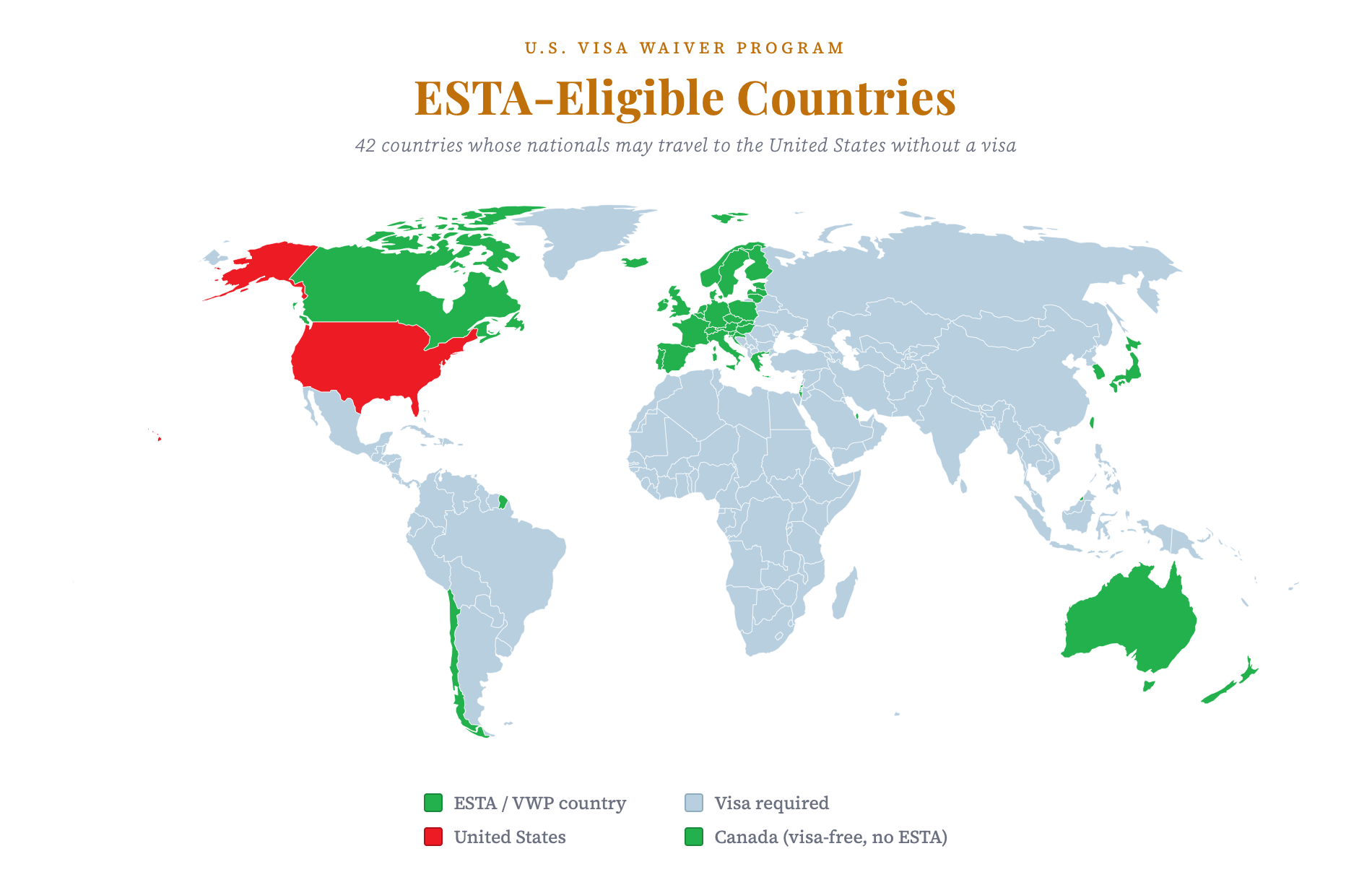
ESTA-eligible countries map

ESTA applications may be made at any time, but travelers are encouraged to apply at least 72 hours prior to travel. ESTA has an application fee of US$10.62, and if approved, an additional fee of $30 is charged, for a total of $40.62. After approval, the authorization remains valid for two years, or until the passport expires if earlier, for multiple trips during that period. (Note: For nationals of Brunei, ESTA is valid for one year.) Each person traveling under the VWP, regardless of age, needs a separate ESTA.

ESTA is also needed for travel under the VWP to the U.S. territories of Puerto Rico, U.S. Virgin Islands, Guam and the Northern Mariana Islands. The latter two territories also have an additional visa waiver program for certain nationalities that requires a different electronic authorization. Travel to American Samoa requires a different permit.

== History ==
Travelers were able to apply for ESTA in August 2008, and the authorization became mandatory for travel by air or sea from January 12, 2009. Since January 20, 2010, airlines may be fined if they do not require ESTA from passengers traveling under the VWP.

Initially, ESTA was available for free from the U.S. Customs and Border Protection (CBP) website. On September 8, 2010, following the Travel Promotion Act, CBP began charging a fee of $4 to cover administrative costs, and if the application was approved, an additional fee of $10 to fund the Corporation for Travel Promotion (also known as Brand USA), for a total of $14 for each approved ESTA. On May 26, 2022, the second fee was increased to $17, for a total of $21 for each approved ESTA.

ESTA became required also for entry by land from October 1, 2022.

On July 6, 2023, the validity of new ESTA applications from nationals of Brunei became limited to one year. From August 1, 2023, to September 30, 2025, the validity of new ESTA applications from nationals of Hungary was limited to one year and to a single use.

On September 30, 2025, following the One Big Beautiful Bill Act, CBP increased the ESTA application fee to $10, and added a third fee of $13, for a total of $40 for each approved ESTA. The act also required annual increases in the application fee based on inflation.

== Eligibility ==
As of 2026, nationals of 42 countries may travel to the United States under the Visa Waiver Program:

- Andorra
- Australia
- Austria
- Belgium
- Brunei
- Chile
- Croatia
- Czech Republic
- Denmark
- Estonia
- Finland
- France
- Germany (Note: Only holders of biometric passports. German child passports, which could be requested for children under age 12 as an alternative to a standard German passport before 2024, are not biometric and thus are not eligible for ESTA. The last passports of this kind will expire at the end of 2026.)
- Greece
- Hungary
- Iceland
- Ireland
- Israel (Note: Only holders of biometric passports issued with full validity, which can only be requested in Israel. Passports requested at Israeli diplomatic missions abroad, which are not biometric, or for recent immigrants in Israel, which are issued with reduced validity, are not eligible for ESTA.)
- Italy
- Japan
- Latvia
- Liechtenstein
- Lithuania
- Luxembourg
- Malta
- Monaco
- Netherlands
- New Zealand
- Norway
- Poland
- Portugal
- Qatar
- San Marino
- Singapore
- Slovakia
- Slovenia
- South Korea
- Spain
- Sweden
- Switzerland
- Taiwan (Note: Only holders of passports with a national identification number.)
- United Kingdom (Note: British citizens are eligible to participate in the VWP, but other categories of UK national are not.)

Visitors under the VWP may stay in the United States for 90 days, which also includes the time spent in Canada, Mexico, Bermuda, or the islands in the Caribbean if the arrival was through the United States.

Due to the Visa Waiver Program Improvement and Terrorist Travel Prevention Act of 2015, those who have been in Iran, Iraq, Libya, North Korea, Somalia, Sudan, Syria or Yemen on or after March 1, 2011, or in Cuba on or after January 12, 2021, or who are dual nationals of Cuba, Iran, Iraq, North Korea, Sudan or Syria, are not eligible to travel under the VWP. However, those who traveled to such countries for diplomatic, military, humanitarian, reporting or legitimate business purposes may have this ineligibility waived by the Secretary of Homeland Security. In any case, those ineligible for the VWP may still apply for a regular visa from a U.S. embassy or consulate.

== Application ==
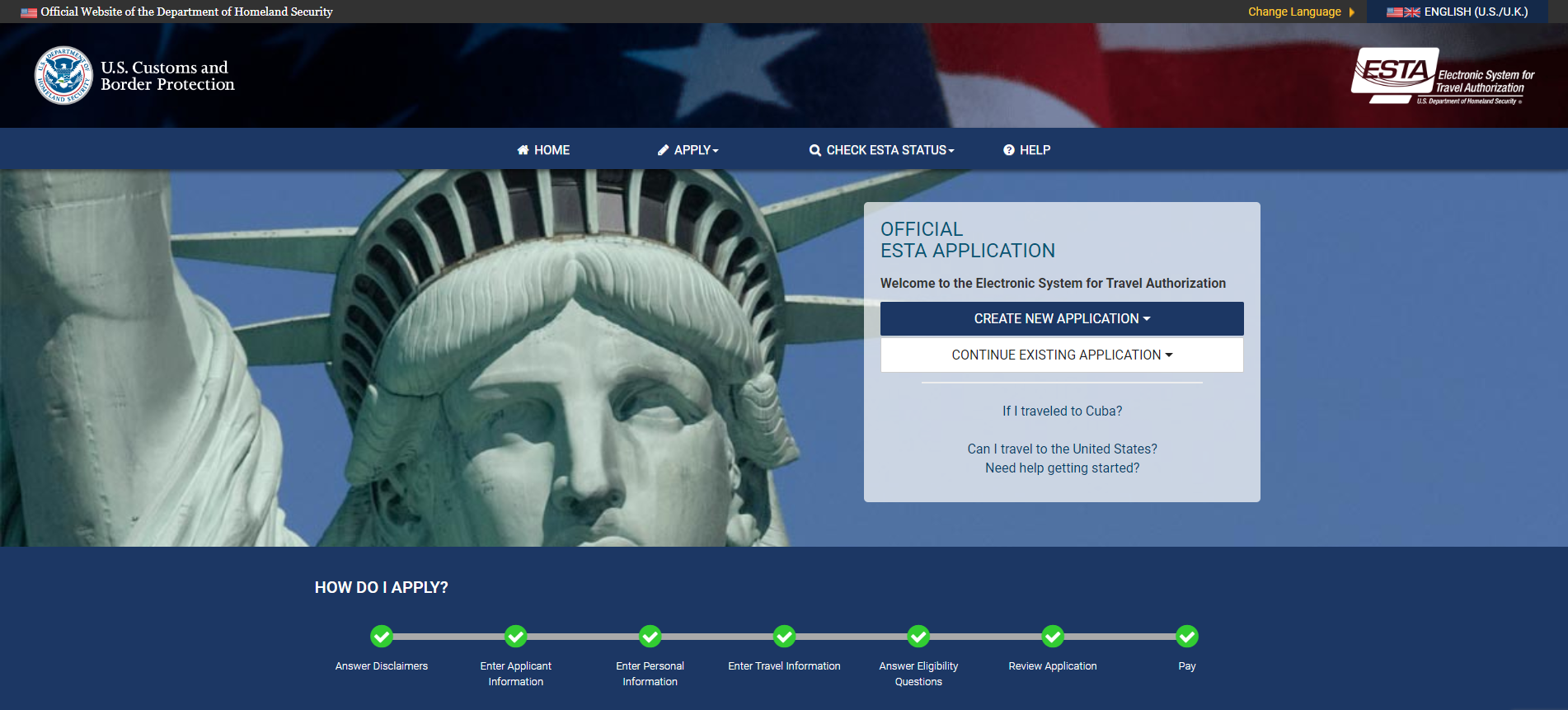
The official website for Electronic System for Travel Authorization applications

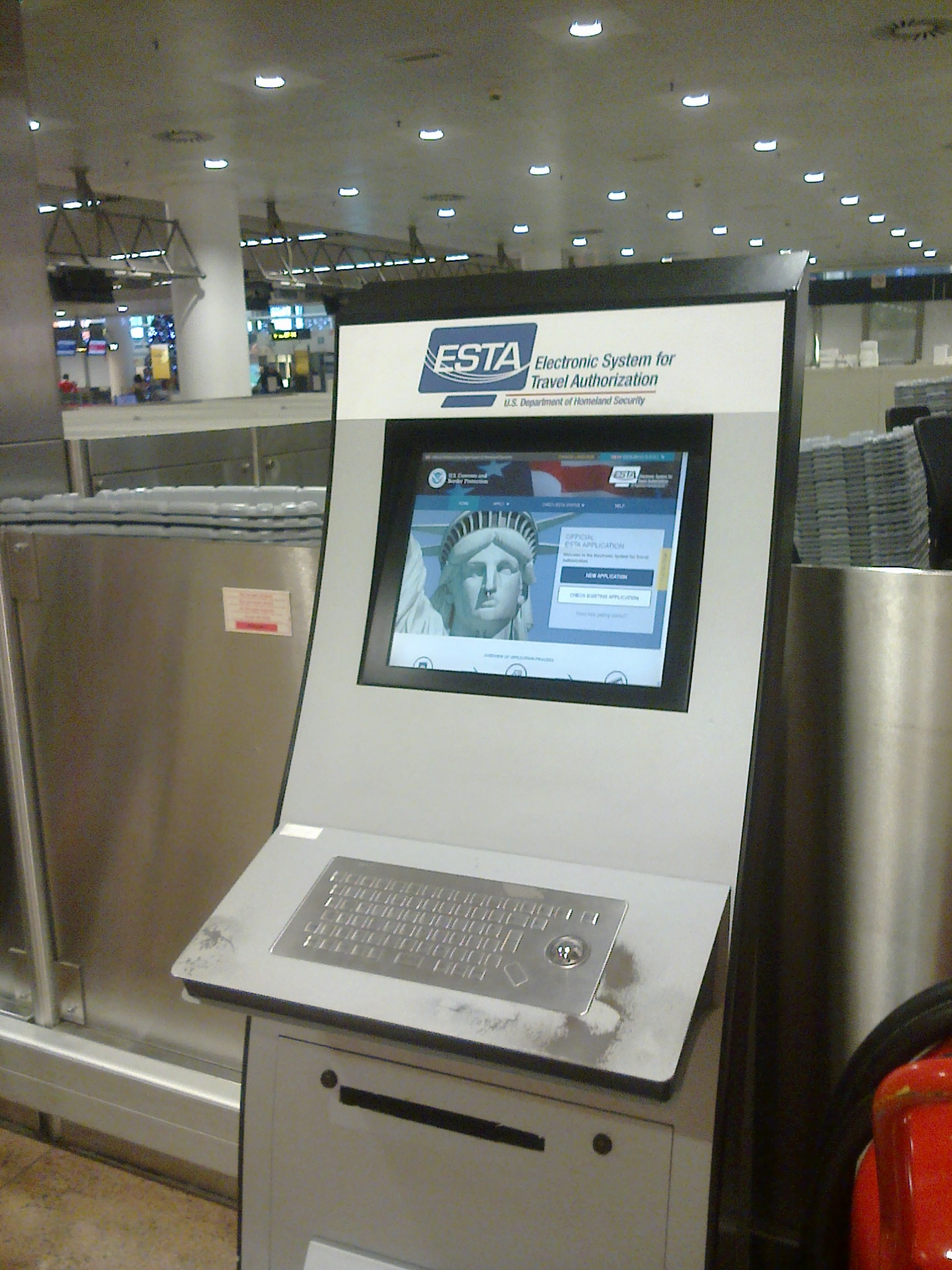
An ESTA terminal at Brussels airport

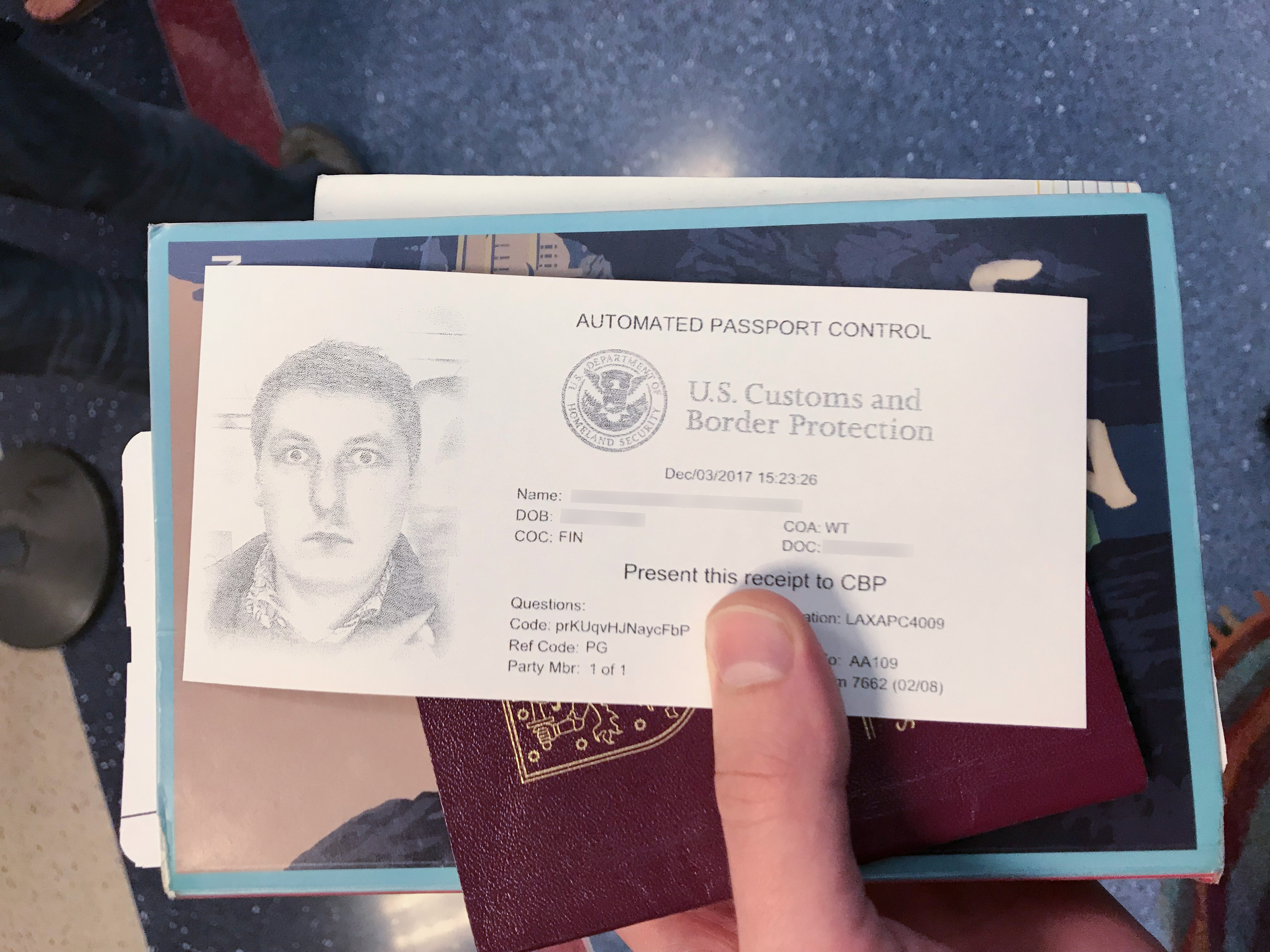
Thermochromatic print out slip of the system

In December 2018, CBP announced that instant ESTA approvals would no longer be available and reiterated that it "strongly encouraged" travelers to submit an online authorization request at least three days (72 hours) before traveling to the United States. However, CBP's website still says that "In most cases, a response is received within seconds of submitting an application." However, some immigration consultants report that decisions on ESTA applications can occasionally take longer than 72 hours: for example, if the applicant has had any previous U.S. visa refusals (even if declared on the application).

Each travel authorization under ESTA can be valid for up to two years, for multiple trips during that period. However, travelers must obtain a new ESTA authorization if they are issued a new passport, or change their name, gender or country of nationality, or if any answer to their ESTA application eligibility questions changes.

Each entry under the Visa Waiver Program is only valid for a combined maximum stay of 90 days in the United States and its surrounding countries. The admission period cannot be extended under the program. If a longer stay is intended, a visa is required.

ESTA does not guarantee entry to the United States. CBP officers make the final determination of admissibility (entry) to the United States and may cancel or deny ESTA at any time during travel, for example for suspicions of giving false information in the application.

=== Mandatory information ===
The applicant must provide the following information:

- Full name and gender
- Other names or aliases, if any
- Date and city of birth (according to passport)
- Country of nationality and passport
- Other nationality including historic, if any
- Passport number and expiration date
- Address
- Parents' names, if known
- Employer's name and address, if any
- Emergency contact, name, phone and address
- U.S. point of contact information (a person, business or hotel one intends to visit)
- Whether the applicant is a member of Global Entry
- Applicants must also specify whether any of the following applies to them by way of yes/no answers. Applications will be denied if the applicant:
  - Has a physical or mental disorder posing a threat to others, or is a drug abuser, or has one of certain contagious diseases such as cholera, diphtheria, tuberculosis, plague, yellow fever, ebola or severe acute respiratory illnesses
  - Has ever been arrested or convicted for a crime that resulted in serious damage to property, or serious harm to another person or government authority
  - Has ever violated any law related to possessing, using, or distributing illegal drugs
  - Plans to engage in or has ever engaged in terrorist activities, espionage, sabotage, or genocide
  - Has committed fraud or misrepresented oneself or others to obtain, or assist others to obtain, a visa or entry into the United States
  - Intends to seek employment in the United States or was previously employed in the United States without prior permission from the U.S. government
  - Has been denied a U.S. visa, or been refused admission to the United States at a U.S. port of entry (This includes any past visa denials under INA 221(g), whereby a visa applicant needed to provide more information or a case needed further processing, even if the visa was later approved).
  - Has previously stayed in the United States longer than the admission period
  - Has traveled to Iran, Iraq, Libya, North Korea, Somalia, Sudan, Syria or Yemen on or after March 1, 2011, or Cuba on or after January 12, 2021

=== Optional information ===
The applicant may optionally provide the following information:

- Provider/Platform - Social media identifier

Information found in social media may be used for applicant vetting and to identify potential threats. If an applicant does not answer the social media question or simply does not hold a social media account, the ESTA application can still be submitted without a negative interpretation or inference.

=== Third-party websites ===
Some websites offer to complete ESTA applications for a fee, often many times more than the required fee charged by the U.S. government. Access and application through the official U.S. government website are available to any travelers who qualify under the VWP program. Prevention of such "ESTA fee scams" was made more difficult when the mandatory U.S. government fee was imposed, as previous public education efforts focused on getting out the message that ESTA applications were free of charge and anybody requesting payment was an unauthorized third-party. Third-party websites try to make themselves look legitimate by using official-sounding web addresses and posting logos that resemble the U.S. government emblem. They may or may not contain a small disclaimer at the bottom of the page that says they are not associated with the U.S. government.

Even if one of the third-party websites is used, passengers themselves still have to complete the same form. Concerns have been raised that third-party sites could be used for identity theft, credit card fraud, or the distribution of malware.

== See also ==
- Electronic visa
- Electronic Travel Authority (Australia)
- Electronic Travel Authorization (Canada)
- European Travel Information and Authorisation System
- New Zealand Electronic Travel Authority
- Trump travel ban
- Electronic Travel Authorisation (United Kingdom)
- Visa policy of the United States
- Electronic Visa Update System (EVUS)
