= Visa Waiver Program Improvement and Terrorist Travel Prevention Act of 2015 =

United States counter-terrorism act

- Long title: An Act to amend the Immigration and Nationality Act to provide enhanced security measures for the visa waiver program, and for other purposes.
- Enacted by: the 114th United States Congress
- Effective: January 21, 2016

Citations
- Public law: 114-113
- Statutes at Large: 129 Stat. 2242

Codification
- U.S.C. sections amended: 8 U.S.C. § 1187

Legislative history
- Introduced in the House as H.R. 158 by Candice Miller (R–MI) on January 6, 2015; Committee consideration by House Judiciary, House Homeland Security; Passed the House on December 8, 2015 (407–19; added to H.R. 2029, passed 316–113 on December 18, 2015); Passed the Senate on December 18, 2015 (65–33, as part of H.R. 2029); Signed into law by President Barack Obama on December 18, 2015

The Visa Waiver Program Improvement and Terrorist Travel Prevention Act of 2015 is an Act of Congress that adds some requirements and restrictions to the Visa Waiver Program, which allows nationals of certain countries to travel to the United States without a visa. Among other requirements, the act disqualifies those who had previously been in certain countries of security concern or who are dual nationals of those countries (in addition to the nationality that would otherwise qualify them for the visa waiver), making them ineligible to travel to the United States without a visa under the program.

As of 2023, the ineligibility applies to those who have been in Iran, Iraq, Libya, North Korea, Somalia, Sudan, Syria or Yemen on or after March 1, 2011 (with some exceptions), or in Cuba on or after January 12, 2021, or who are nationals of Cuba, Iran, Iraq, North Korea, Sudan or Syria. Those ineligible for the Visa Waiver Program may still apply for a visa, and if granted, may travel to the United States.

== Legislative history ==
In 1986, Congress created the Visa Waiver Program (VWP), which allows nationals of countries with low rates of visa refusals to travel to the United States without a visa. Implementation of the visa waiver started in 1988. In the years following the terrorist attacks of September 11, 2001, many requirements were added for VWP visitors: a machine-readable passport, from October 1, 2003, for some VWP countries, and from June 26, 2005, for all VWP countries; a passport with a digital photograph printed directly on it, if issued from October 26, 2005; a biometric passport, if issued from October 26, 2006; an electronic authorization before travel by air or sea, from January 12, 2009; and a fee to obtain such authorization, from September 8, 2010. By 2014, 38 countries had been admitted to the VWP.

On January 6, 2015, H.R. 158, originally named the Visa Waiver Program Improvement Act of 2015, was introduced in the House of Representatives. The original version of this bill would not add any restrictions on VWP visitors, but would only clarify that ineligibility due to a security risk included terrorism, allow the suspension of countries from the program if they did not share the required security information about their nationals traveling to the United States, and require some reports by government agencies to Congress.

After the November 2015 Paris attacks, the U.S. government became concerned that the Islamic State and other terrorist organizations could recruit nationals of VWP countries, who could enter the United States without a visa, to carry out terrorist attacks. To address this concern, H.R. 158 was amended to disqualify from the VWP those who had been in certain countries of security concern on or after March 1, 2011, or who were also nationals of these countries. The bill defined the countries of concern as Iraq, Syria, other countries designated as state sponsors of terrorism by the Department of State, and other countries to be designated by the Department of Homeland Security for this purpose.

The amendment also restated the biometric passport requirement, added or clarified requirements for countries to report lost passports, validate passports at entry and screen travelers for Interpol notices, expanded the basis for suspension of countries from the VWP, and modified the required reports to Congress. The amended bill was renamed the Visa Waiver Program Improvement and Terrorist Travel Prevention Act of 2015.

H.R. 158 as amended was passed by the House of Representatives on December 8, 2015, but this bill did not progress further. However, the same text was added to the miscellaneous division of H.R. 2029, the Consolidated Appropriations Act, 2016, whose final version was passed by the House and Senate on December 18, 2015, and was signed into law by President Barack Obama on the same day.

== Implementation ==
The restrictions were initially implemented on January 21, 2016. From this date, those who had been in Iran, Iraq, Sudan or Syria on or after March 1, 2011, or who were also nationals of these countries (in addition to the nationality that would otherwise qualify them for the VWP), became ineligible for the VWP. Iraq and Syria were designated as countries of concern directly in the law. Iran and Sudan were added because they were, along with Syria, the countries designated as state sponsors of terrorism by the Department of State at the time.

On February 18, 2016, the Department of Homeland Security designated Libya, Somalia and Yemen as countries of concern, only regarding presence in these countries on or after March 1, 2011. However, merely having the nationality of these countries would not disqualify the person from the VWP.

North Korea was redesignated as a state sponsor of terrorism on November 20, 2017. From August 5, 2019, those who had been in North Korea on or after March 1, 2011, or who were nationals of North Korea became ineligible for the VWP.

Cuba was redesignated as a state sponsor of terrorism on January 12, 2021. Around August 2022, those who had been in Cuba on or after January 12, 2021, also became ineligible for the VWP. In July 2023, those who were nationals of Cuba also became ineligible.

Sudan was removed from the list of state sponsors of terrorism on December 14, 2020, but as of 2023 it was still included as a country of concern for the VWP restrictions.

=== Waivers ===
Those who became ineligible for the VWP due to having traveled to the countries of concern as diplomats, military, government or humanitarian workers, journalists or legitimate businessmen may apply to have this ineligibility waived. However, there is no waiver of ineligibility for having the nationality of a country of concern.

In any case, the ineligibility only applies for travel without a visa under the VWP. Those ineligible for the VWP may still apply for a visa, and if granted, may travel to the United States.

These restrictions do not apply to other visa waivers, such as for nationals of certain North American jurisdictions and countries with a Compact of Free Association.

== Criticism ==
Some civil liberties groups expressed concerns about basing a law on nationality. The American Civil Liberties Union wrote: "We urge Congress to exercise caution and to avoid passing legislation that would broadly scapegoat groups based on nationality, and would fan the flames of discriminatory exclusion, both here and abroad." Atossa Araxia Abrahamian, in an article for The New York Times, wrote: "All countries should do their best to stop people who pose a genuine security threat, regardless of what papers they may carry. But ascribing guilt by association isn't the way to do it."

It was also pointed out that nationals of the affected countries were not part of any terrorist attack in the United States.

In 2017, President Donald Trump used the VWP restrictions as a basis for Executive Order 13769.

== See also ==
- Trump travel ban
