= Visa Waiver Program =

US program allowing visa-free travel

The United States and its territories Freely associated states (freedom of movement) Visa-free (6 months) Visa Waiver Program (90 days) Visa-free with police certificate (6 months) Visa required to enter the United States Immigrant visa issuance suspended Immigrant, visitor, student and exchange visa issuance suspended Visa issuance suspended Admission refused

The Visa Waiver Program (VWP) is a program of the United States government that allows nationals of specific countries to travel to the United States for tourism, business, or while in transit for up to 90 days without having to obtain a visa. It applies to all fifty U.S. states, the District of Columbia, Puerto Rico, and the U.S. Virgin Islands, as well as to Guam and the Northern Mariana Islands, which also have an additional program with waivers for more nationalities; American Samoa has a similar but separate program.

The countries selected for the VWP by the U.S. government are generally regarded as developed countries, with high-income economies and a very high Human Development Index.

Other visa waivers exist for citizens of some neighboring or associated countries and territories.

== Eligible countries ==
To be eligible for a visa waiver under the VWP, the traveler seeking admission to the United States must be a national of a country that has been designated by the U.S. Secretary of Homeland Security, in consultation with the Secretary of State, as a "program country". Permanent residents of designated countries who are not their nationals do not qualify for a visa waiver. The criteria for designation as program countries are specified in Section 217(c) of the Immigration and Nationality Act (8 U.S.C. § 1187). The criteria stress passport security, a visitor visa refusal rate below 3%, and a reciprocal visa waiver for U.S. nationals, among other requirements.

As of 2026, nationals of 42 countries are eligible for entry into the United States without a visa under the VWP:

- European Union member states (except Bulgaria, Cyprus and Romania) (Note: Only holders of biometric passports. German child passports, which could be requested for children under age 12 as an alternative to a standard German passport before 2024, are not biometric and thus are not eligible for ESTA. The last passports of this kind were set to expire at the end of 2026.)
- European Free Trade Association member states
Rest of Europe
- Andorra
- Monaco
- San Marino
- United Kingdom (Note: Only holders of passports indicating British citizen are eligible for ESTA.)

South America

- Chile
Asia-Pacific
- Australia
- Brunei
- Japan
- New Zealand
- Singapore
- South Korea
- Taiwan (Note: Only holders of passports with a national identification number.)
Middle East
- Israel (Note: Only holders of biometric passports issued with full validity, which can only be requested in Israel. Passports requested at Israeli diplomatic missions abroad, which are not biometric, or for recent immigrants in Israel, which are issued with reduced validity, are not eligible for ESTA.)
- Qatar

== Requirements ==
=== Passport ===
All visitors from VWP countries must hold a biometric passport.

All travelers must have individual passports. It is not acceptable (for the VWP) for children to be included on a parent's passport.

In principle, the passport must be valid for six months beyond the expected date of departure from the United States. However, the United States has agreements with a large number of countries to waive this requirement, including all VWP countries except Brunei.

=== Electronic System for Travel Authorization (ESTA) ===
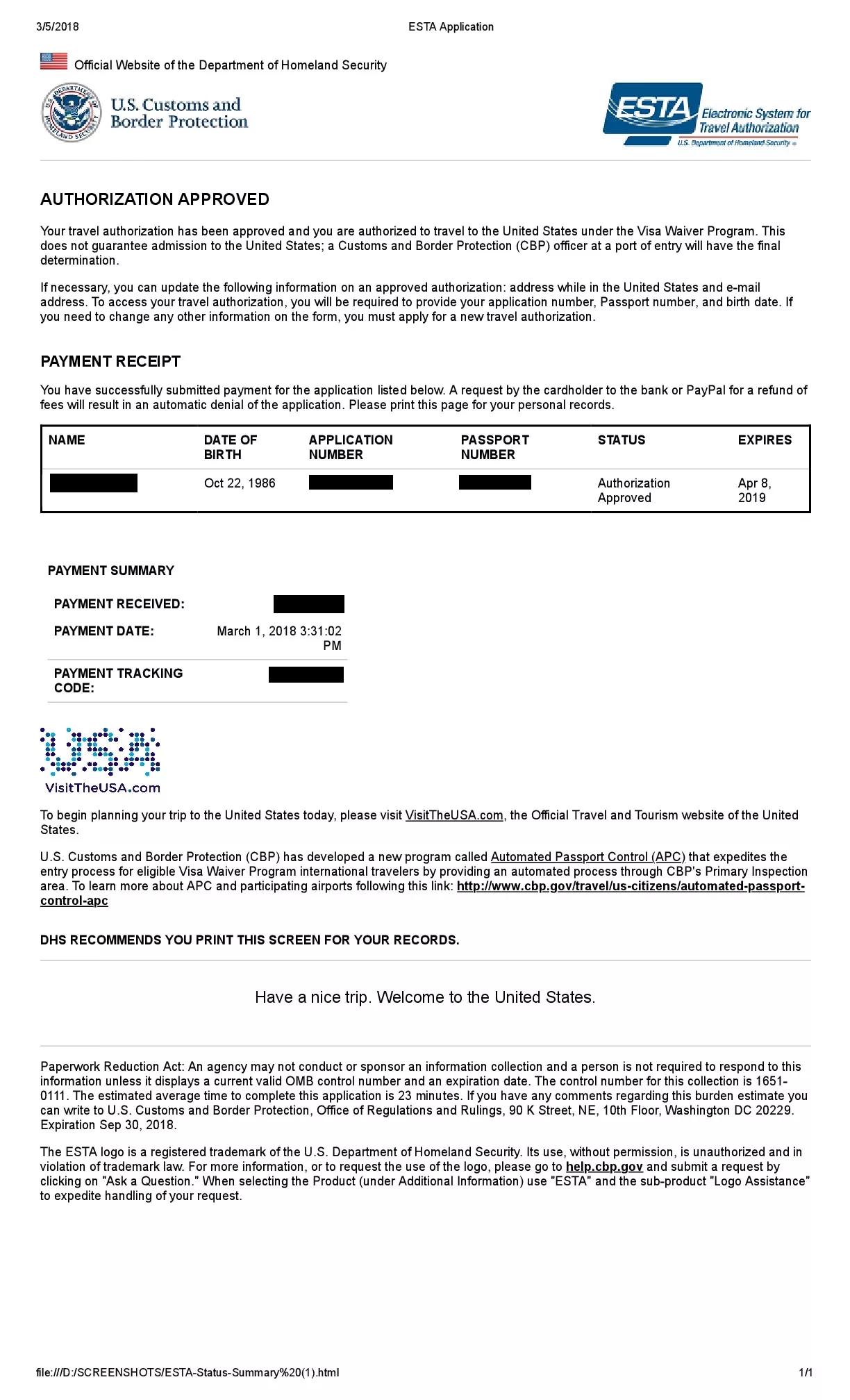
Record of ESTA approval

All incoming passengers who intend to take advantage of the Visa Waiver Program are required to apply for a travel authorization through the Electronic System for Travel Authorization (ESTA) online before departure to the United States, preferably at least 72 hours (3 days) in advance. This requirement was announced on June 3, 2008 and is intended to bolster U.S. security by pre-screening participating VWP passengers against terrorist or no-fly lists and databases. It is similar to Australia's Electronic Travel Authority system. The authorization is mandatory for participating VWP nationals before traveling to the United States, but as with formal visas this does not guarantee admission into the United States since final admission eligibility is determined at U.S. ports of entry by CBP officers.

ESTA has an application fee of US$10.62, and if approved, an additional fee of $30 is charged, for a total of $40.62. An approved ESTA is valid for up to two years (one year for nationals of Brunei) or until the traveler's passport expires, whichever comes first, and is valid for multiple entries into the United States.

When traveling to the United States by air or sea under the VWP with ESTA, the person must be traveling on a participating commercial carrier and hold a valid return or onward ticket, dated within 90 days. The final destination of their itinerary must be outside Canada, Mexico, and adjacent islands in the Caribbean and of Saint Pierre and Miquelon. (Note: "Adjacent islands" include Anguilla, Antigua, Aruba, the Bahamas, Barbados, Barbuda, Bermuda, Bonaire, the British Virgin Islands, the Cayman Islands, Curaçao, Dominica, the Dominican Republic, Grenada, Guadeloupe, Haiti, Jamaica, Marie-Galante, Martinique, Miquelon, Montserrat, Saba, Saint Barthélemy, Saint Kitts (listed in the regulation as "Saint Christopher"), Sint Eustatius, Nevis, Saint Lucia, Sint Maarten, Saint Martin, Saint Pierre, Saint Vincent and the Grenadines, Trinidad and Tobago, the Turks and Caicos Islands, and other British, French, and Dutch territories or possessions bordering the Caribbean Sea.) However, VWP passengers who can prove residence in Canada, Mexico, or adjacent islands in the Caribbean and of Saint Pierre and Miquelon may instead show a return or onward ticket to their country or territory of residence.

The VWP does not apply at all (i.e. a visa is required) if a passenger arrives via air or sea on an unapproved carrier.

ESTA is also required for travel by land.

=== Prior travel or dual nationality in certain countries ===
Since 2016, those who have previously been in Iran, Iraq, Libya, North Korea, Somalia, Sudan, Syria or Yemen on or after March 1, 2011, or in Cuba on or after January 12, 2021, or who are dual nationals of Cuba, Iran, Iraq, North Korea, Sudan or Syria, are not eligible to travel under the VWP. However, those who traveled to such countries for diplomatic, military, humanitarian, reporting or legitimate business purposes may have this ineligibility waived by the Secretary of Homeland Security.

=== Other requirements ===
Applicants for admission under the Visa Waiver Program:

- Must have complied with the conditions of all previous admissions to the United States and have not been found ineligible for a U.S. visa.
- Must never have been convicted of, or arrested for, an offense or crime involving moral turpitude (Note: There is an exemption in some cases for a single offense committed before age 18 and the crime was committed (and the person released from any confinement to a prison or correctional institution imposed for the crime) more than five years before the date of application for a visa, and also for a single instance if the maximum possible sentence in the United States is one year or less in jail, and less than six months was served. However, these exceptions cannot be applied by the individual as the question on ESTA is specific.) or a controlled substance, or two or more crimes with a maximum aggregate sentence of five years' imprisonment or more, no matter how long ago. National regulations which normally expunge criminal records after a certain length of time (e.g. the Rehabilitation of Offenders Act 1974 in the UK) do not apply.
- Must not be otherwise inadmissible to the United States, such as on health or national security grounds.
- Must be intending to visit the United States for a purpose of tourism, business or transit.

Applicants should display social and economic ties which bind them to their country of origin or may be refused entry.

Having been arrested or convicted does not in itself make a person ineligible to use the Visa Waiver Program. However, some U.S. embassies advise such persons to apply for a tourist visa even though there is no legal obligation to do so.

Those who do not meet the requirements for the Visa Waiver Program must obtain a U.S. visitor visa from a U.S. embassy or consulate.

=== Restrictions ===
Visitors under the VWP may stay for up to 90 days in the United States and cannot request an extension of the original allowed period of stay (this practice is allowed to those holding regular visas). However, VWP visitors may seek to adjust status on the basis of either marriage to a U.S. citizen or an application for asylum.

U.S. Customs and Border Protection (CBP) officers determine admissibility upon the traveler's arrival. If one seeks to enter the United States under the VWP and is denied entry by a CBP officer at a port of entry, there is no path to appeal or review of the denial of entry.

Travelers can leave to neighboring jurisdictions (Canada, Mexico and adjacent islands in the Caribbean and of Saint Pierre and Miquelon), but will not be granted another 90 days after reentry in the United States; instead they are readmitted to the United States for the remaining days granted on their initial entry. Transit through the United States is generally permitted, if the total time in the United States, Canada, Mexico and adjacent islands is less than 90 days. However, if for example the traveler is transiting the United States on the way to a 6-month stay in Canada, the VWP cannot be used, as the total time in the United States, Canada, Mexico and adjacent islands will be over 90 days. In this case the traveler should apply for a B-1/B-2 visa, or a transit visa.

There are restrictions on the type of employment-related activities allowed. Meetings and conferences in relation to the travelers' profession, line of business or employer in their home country are generally acceptable, but most forms of "gainful employment" are not. There are however poorly-classifiable exceptions such as persons performing professional services in the United States for a non-U.S. employer, and persons installing, servicing and repairing commercial or industrial equipment or machinery pursuant to a contract of sale. Performers (such as actors and musicians) who plan on performing live or taping scenes for productions in their country of origin, as well as athletes participating in an athletic event, are likewise not allowed to use the VWP for their respective engagements and are instead required to have an O or P visa prior to arrival. Foreign media representatives and journalists on assignment are required to have a nonimmigrant media (I) visa.

== History ==
Congress passed legislation in 1986 to create the Visa Waiver Program with the aim of facilitating tourism and short-term business visits to the United States, and allowing the United States Department of State to focus consular resources on addressing higher risks. The United Kingdom became the first country to participate in the Visa Waiver Program in July 1988, followed by Japan in December 1988. In July 1989, France, Italy, Netherlands, Sweden, Switzerland and West Germany were added to the VWP.

In 1991, more European countries joined the Program – Andorra, Austria, Belgium, Denmark, Finland, Iceland, Liechtenstein, Luxembourg, Monaco, Norway, San Marino and Spain – as well as New Zealand (the first country from Oceania). In 1993, Brunei became the second Asian country to be admitted to the Program.

On April 1, 1995, Ireland was added to the VWP. In 1996, Australia and Argentina (the first Latin American country) joined, although Argentina was later removed in 2002. On September 30, 1997, Slovenia was added. On August 9, 1999, Portugal, Singapore and Uruguay joined the program, although Uruguay was subsequently removed in 2003.

Following the September 11 terrorist attacks, the George W. Bush administration decided to tighten entry requirements into the United States, as a result of which legislation was passed requiring foreign visitors entering under the Visa Waiver Program to present a machine-readable passport upon arrival starting from October 1, 2003, and a biometric passport from October 26, 2004. However, as a number of VWP countries still issued non-machine readable passports (for example, more than a third of French and Spanish passport holders held a non-machine readable version), the implementation of this rule was postponed to October 26, 2004, with the exception of Belgian nationals, as there were concerns about the security and integrity of Belgian passports. Likewise, the biometric passport requirement was also postponed to October 26, 2005, only to be further postponed by another year to October 26, 2006 at the request of the European Union, which raised concerns about the number of participating countries which would have been able to make the deadline. When the new rule came into force on that day, three countries (Andorra, Brunei and Liechtenstein) had not yet started issuing biometric passports.

In November 2006, the U.S. government announced that plans for an "Electronic Travel Authorization" program (officially named "Electronic System for Travel Authorization") would be developed so that VWP travelers can give advance information on their travels to the United States. In return, they will be given authorization electronically to travel to the United States, although it does not guarantee admission to the United States. This program is modeled on the Electronic Travel Authority scheme that has been used in Australia for many years.

Argentina's participation in the VWP was terminated in 2002 in light of the financial crisis taking place in that country and its potential effect on mass emigration and unlawful overstay of its nationals in the United States by way of the VWP. Uruguay's participation in the program was revoked in 2003 for similar reasons. While a country's political and economic standing does not directly determine its eligibility, it is widely believed that nationals of politically stable and economically developed nations would not have much incentive to illegally seek employment and violate their visa while in the United States, risks that consular officers seriously consider in approving or denying a visa.

=== Road map ===
After the 2004 enlargement of the European Union, both the newly admitted countries and EU agencies began intensive lobbying efforts to include those new countries in the VWP. The U.S. government initially responded to those efforts by developing bilateral strategies with 19 candidate countries known as the Visa Waiver road map process. The U.S. government began to accept the possibility of departing from the original country designation criteria – which had been contained within immigration law per se – and to expand them by adding political criteria, with the latter being able to override the former. This development began first with Bill S.2844 which explicitly named Poland as the only country to be added to the VWP, and continued as an amendment to the Comprehensive Immigration Reform Act of 2006 (S.2611), whose Sec. 413, Visa Waiver Program Expansion, defined broader criteria that would apply to any EU country that provided "material support" to the multinational forces in Iraq and Afghanistan. However, the definition of that "material support" would be met again only by Poland and Romania, a fact that was not favorably received by the other EU candidate countries.

During his visit to Estonia in November 2006, President Bush announced his intention "to work with our Congress and our international partners to modify our visa waiver program". In 2006, the Secure Travel and Counterterrorism Partnership Bill was introduced in the Senate but no action was taken and that bill, as well as a similar one introduced in the House the following year, died after two years of inactivity. The bill would have directed the Secretary of Homeland Security to establish a pilot program to expand the visa waiver program for up to five new countries that were cooperating with the United States on security and counterterrorism matters.

A June 2007 Hudson Institute Panel stressed the urgency of the inclusion of Central Europe in the VWP: "An inexplicable policy that is causing inestimable damage to the United States with its new Central and Eastern European NATO allies is the region's exclusion from the visa waiver program. As Helle Dale wrote in the spring issue of European Affairs: "Meanwhile, the problem is fueling anti-U.S. antagonisms and a perception of capricious discrimination by U.S. bureaucrats ---and damping the visits to the United States of people from countries with whom Washington would like to improve commercial and intellectual ties. Meanwhile, horror stories abound from friends and diplomats from Central and Eastern Europe about the problems besetting foreigners seeking to visit the United States. In fact bringing up the subject of visas with any resident of those countries is like waving a red flag before a bull." Visa waiver must be satisfactorily addressed and resolved at long last."

The Implementing Recommendations of the 9/11 Commission Act of 2007 allowed the inclusion of new countries in the VWP with a visa refusal rate up to 10% (up from the standard requirement of 3%) if they satisfied certain other conditions, from October 2008. With the relaxed criteria, eight countries were added to the program: Czech Republic, Estonia, Hungary, Latvia, Lithuania, Slovakia and South Korea in November 2008, and Malta in December 2008. Czech Prime Minister Mirek Topolánek called it "a removal of the last relict of Communism and the Cold War". However, from July 2009, the authority to include countries with such higher visa refusal rate became conditioned on the implementation of a system capable of matching the entry and exit from the United States of travelers under the VWP using biometric identifiers. As such system was not implemented, the visa refusal rate requirement returned to 3%.

Greece officially joined the program on April 5, 2010.

On October 2, 2012, Secretary Janet Napolitano announced the inclusion of Taiwan into the program effective on November 1, 2012. Only holders of passports with a national identification number would benefit from the visa waiver.

In 2013, there was conflict over the United States-Israel Strategic Partnership Act of 2013 whose Senate version specified that satisfaction of the requirements regarding reciprocal travel privileges for U.S. nationals would be subject to security concerns. Many members of the House of Representatives opposed the security language because it seemed to validate Israel's tendency to turn away Arab Americans without giving any reason. None of the other 37 countries in the visa waiver program had such an exemption.

Chief Executive of Hong Kong Donald Tsang raised the issue of allowing holders of Hong Kong Special Administrative Region passports or British National (Overseas) passports to participate in the VWP during his visit to the United States in 2011, but proposals to allow this were not successful. Hong Kong was the only jurisdiction with a higher Human Development Index than the United States whose citizens could not enjoy the program. The visa refusal rate for Hong Kong dropped to 1.7% for HKSAR passport and 2.6% for British National (Overseas) passport in 2012. Hong Kong met all VWP criteria but did not qualify because it was not legally a separate country, despite having its own passports and independent judicial system, monetary system and immigration control. In 2013, a bipartisan bill was introduced in Congress to allow Hong Kong to qualify for the VWP as if it were a country, but it was not further considered. On August 10, 2015, the U.S. Consul General to Hong Kong and Macau, Clifford Hart, said during an interview with South China Morning Post that the visa waiver was "not happening anytime soon", as the Visa Waiver law required the participant to be a "sovereign state" and Hong Kong was not independent, thus ending the possibility of Hong Kong joining the program. He also denied that the failed lobbying effort of the HKSAR government on this issue was a result of the refusal of detaining Edward Snowden in 2013.

Chile joined the VWP on March 31, 2014.

In 2014, the European Union pressured the United States to extend the Visa Waiver Program to its five member states that were not yet included in it (Bulgaria, Croatia, Cyprus, Poland and Romania). In November 2014, the Bulgarian government announced that it would not ratify the Transatlantic Trade and Investment Partnership unless the United States lifted the visa requirement for its nationals. Due to incomplete U.S. reciprocity, in March 2017 the European Parliament approved a non-binding resolution calling on the European Commission to suspend the visa exemption for U.S. nationals to travel the Schengen Area. On May 2, 2017, the European Commission decided not act on the resolution and hoped to restart full visa reciprocity negotiations for the remaining EU member states with the new U.S. administration.

In December 2018, ESTA was no longer processed in real time, and travelers were advised to apply at least 72 hours before departure.

In July 2019, U.S. Ambassador to Poland Georgette Mosbacher stated that "Poland would fully qualify for the Visa Waiver Program within 3 to 6 months after September 2019" depending on bureaucratic procedures. On October 4, 2019, U.S. President Donald Trump confirmed that the Department of State had formally nominated Poland for entry into the Visa Waiver Program. On November 11, 2019 Poland officially joined the Program and became its 39th member.

On February 12, 2021, U.S. Embassy in Croatia's Chargé d'Affaires Victoria Taylor announced on Twitter that the refusal rate for business and tourist visas in Croatia in 2020 dropped to 2.69%, marking a step forward for Croatia to join the VWP "in the near future." On August 2, 2021, Secretary of State Antony Blinken announced that Croatia had been formally nominated to join the VWP. On September 28, 2021, Secretary of Homeland Security Alejandro Mayorkas officially announced that Croatia would join the VWP before December 1, 2021. Croatia joined the VWP on October 23, 2021.

In October 2020, the European Parliament repeated its request for the European Commission to suspend the visa exemption for U.S. nationals, and in March 2021, it filed a judicial action against the European Commission for its failure to act on the subject. In September 2023, the Court of Justice of the European Union dismissed the judicial action brought by the European Parliament, ruling that the European Commission was not obligated to suspend the visa exemption for U.S. nationals.

On March 15, 2023, Democratic senator Dick Durbin introduced a bill that would allow including Romania in the VWP regardless of the program requirements.

On July 6, 2023, the validity of new ESTA applications by nationals of Brunei was reduced to one year.

On September 27, 2023, Israel was designated to join the VWP by November 30, 2023. Israel joined the VWP on October 19, 2023.

On September 24, 2024, Qatar was designated to join the VWP by December 1, 2024. Qatar joined the VWP on November 21, 2024.

In December 2023, during a visit to the United States, Romanian Prime Minister Marcel Ciolacu said that Romania's entry into the U.S. visa-free program would be announced in 2024, ahead of the 2025 deadline discussed with the U.S. representatives. On January 10, 2025, it was announced that Romania would join the VWP by March 31, 2025. However, on March 25, 2025, Romania's entry was put on hold amid further security review. After the conclusion of the review, on May 2, 2025, the designation of Romania to the VWP was rescinded.

On July 28, 2025, it was announced that Argentina would rejoin the VWP, but the process was paused in September 2025.

Date of addition to the Visa Waiver Program
- July 1, 1988: United Kingdom
- December 15, 1988: Japan
- July 1, 1989: France, Switzerland
- July 15, 1989: (West) Germany, Sweden
- July 29, 1989: Italy, Netherlands
- October 1, 1991: Andorra, Austria, Belgium, Denmark, Finland, Iceland, Liechtenstein, Luxembourg, Monaco, New Zealand, Norway, San Marino, Spain
- July 29, 1993: Brunei
- April 1, 1995: Ireland
- July 8, 1996: Argentina
- July 29, 1996: Australia
- September 30, 1997: Slovenia
- August 9, 1999: Portugal, Singapore, Uruguay
- February 21, 2002: removed Argentina
- April 15, 2003: removed Uruguay
- November 17, 2008: Czech Republic, Estonia, Hungary, Latvia, Lithuania, Slovakia, South Korea
- December 30, 2008: Malta
- April 5, 2010: Greece
- November 1, 2012: Taiwan
- March 31, 2014: Chile
- November 11, 2019: Poland
- October 23, 2021: Croatia
- October 19, 2023: Israel
- November 21, 2024: Qatar

=== Hungary ===
In October 2017, U.S. officials discovered a massive passport fraud scheme in Hungary, in which hundreds of non-Hungarians obtained genuine Hungarian passports. A U.S. Department of Homeland Security report (obtained by the Washington Post and reported in May 2018) showed that of approximately 700 non-Hungarians who had obtained the passports, 85 had attempted to travel to the United States under false identites, 65 had been admitted to the United States through the VWP, and (as of October 2017) approximately 30 remained in the United States despite the efforts of U.S. authorities to locate and deport them. The fraud was enabled by a policy implemented in 2011 by Hungarian Prime Minister Viktor Orbán; under the policy, the Hungarian government provided passports to ethnic Hungarians living outside Hungary, who could prove that one of their ancestors was a Hungarian citizen, with the goal of expediting naturalization. More than a million people obtained Hungarian citizenship through the program. Because the program lacked stringent identity-verification procedures, it was abused by bad actors, including criminals and applicants who used forged documents to falsely claim Hungarian descent. Some who received Hungarian passports under the program were criminals without any connection to Hungary.

U.S. officials were alarmed by the risks created by the program, including the risk that the passports might be used in drug smuggling, organized crime, illegal immigration, espionage, or terrorism. In October 2017, the U.S. government downgraded Hungary's status in the VWP to "provisional" and sought to develop a "cooperative action plan" within 45 days. U.S. and Hungarian officials engaged in a dialogue for several years on resolving the security risks, but Hungarian authorities failed to resolve the issues to the U.S. government's satisfaction. As a result, in February 2021, the U.S. government barred Hungarian passport-holders who were not born in Hungary from obtaining ESTA pre-travel authorizations. In August 2023, the U.S. government imposed additional restrictions on Hungary's participation in the VWP: the ESTA validity period for Hungarian passport-holders was reduced from two years to one year, and each ESTA on a Hungarian passport would be valid for only one entry to the United States. After the Hungarian government addressed the security risks, the U.S. government removed all these restrictions on September 30, 2025.

=== Aspiring countries ===
Of the 19 road map countries listed in 2007, 12 have been admitted to the VWP. In 2024, the U.S. government cited six countries aspiring to join the VWP:

- Argentina (Note: Included in the VWP from 1996 to 2002.)
- Brazil
- Bulgaria
- Cyprus
- Romania
- Uruguay (Note: Included in the VWP from 1999 to 2003.)

Turkey, the remaining road map country listed in 2007, was no longer cited as an aspiring country in 2024. Chile, Croatia and Qatar were not listed as road map countries in 2007 but were later admitted to the VWP.

Cyprus, United Arab Emirates, Uruguay and Vatican City had a visa refusal rate lower than 3% in fiscal year 2025, satisfying a critical requirement to join the VWP.

== U.S. territories ==
The Visa Waiver Program applies to all permanently inhabited U.S. territories except American Samoa.

=== Guam and the Northern Mariana Islands ===
Although the U.S. Visa Waiver Program also applies to the U.S. territories of Guam and the Northern Mariana Islands, and therefore nationals of VWP countries may travel to these territories with an ESTA, both territories have an additional visa waiver program for certain nationalities. The Guam–CNMI Visa Waiver Program, first enacted in October 1988 and periodically amended, permits nationals of 12 countries to travel to Guam and the Northern Mariana Islands for up to 45 days, for tourism or business, without the need to obtain a U.S. visa. This program also requires an electronic travel authorization similar to ESTA but without a fee.

- Australia
- Brunei
- Hong Kong (Note: Holders of a Hong Kong Special Administrative Region passport with a Hong Kong identity card.)
- Japan
- Malaysia
- Nauru
- New Zealand
- Papua New Guinea
- Singapore
- South Korea
- Taiwan (Note: Must travel on a nonstop flight from Taiwan and hold a valid Taiwan passport and national identification card.)
- United Kingdom (Note: Holders of a British citizen passport, or a British National (Overseas) passport with a Hong Kong identity card.)

=== American Samoa ===
U.S. visa policy does not apply to American Samoa, as it has its own entry requirements and maintains control of its own borders. If required, a visitor permit must be obtained from the American Samoa Department of Legal Affairs.

Holders of a valid U.S. visa or green card, nationals of Canada, Marshall Islands, Micronesia, Palau, and countries in the U.S. Visa Waiver Program may apply online for a visitor permit for a stay of up to 30 days, for a fee of US$40. Nationals of Samoa may apply online for a visitor permit for a stay of up to 10 days, for a fee of $10.

Other visitors need to obtain a visitor permit through a local sponsor, who must apply for it in person at the Immigration Office of the Department of Legal Affairs.

== Statistics ==
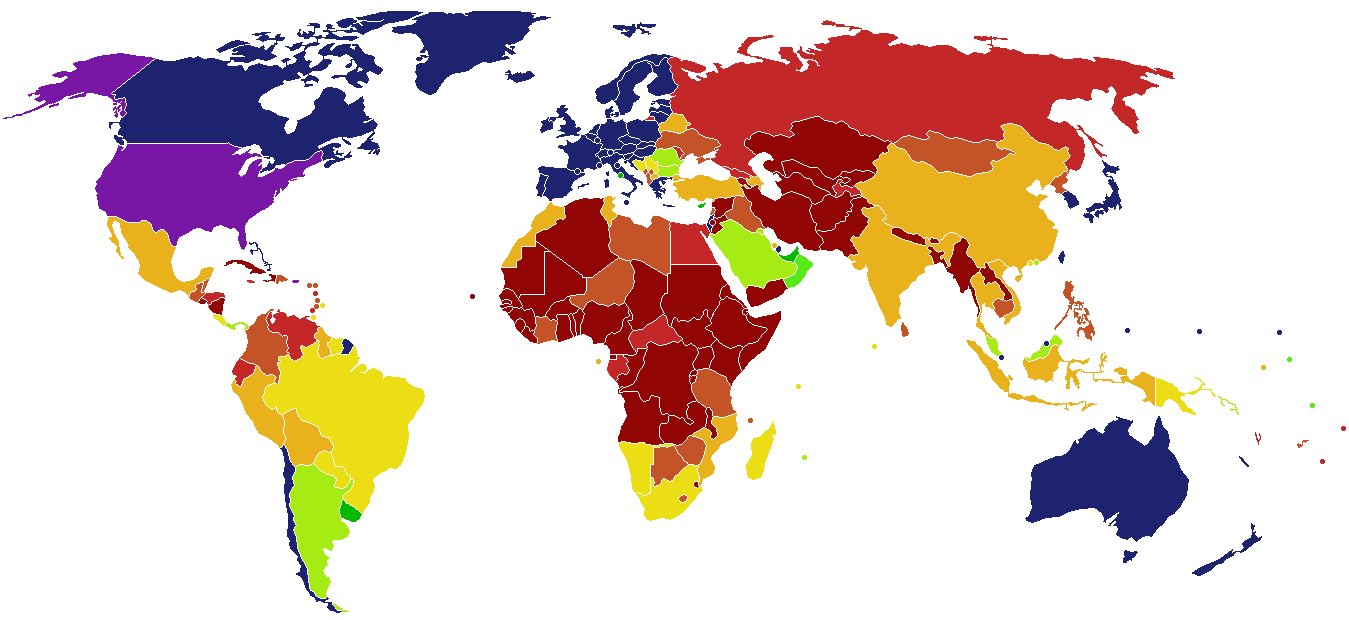
U.S. B visa refusal rate in fiscal year 2025 (October 2024 to September 2025): <3% 3–5% 5–10% 10–20% / 20–30% 30–40% 40–50% >50% / United States Visa-exempt countries No B visa applications

=== Admissions ===
Admissions into the United States under the VWP by country and fiscal year
Country	2023	2022	2021	2020	2019	2018	2017	2016
Andorra	1,290	1,100	80	532	1,544	1,692	1,371	1,357
Australia	945,480	463,792	23,096	532,815	1,369,855	1,412,605	1,431,077	1,393,642
Austria	168,580	122,008	8,779	79,871	208,366	206,643	210,727	216,122
Belgium	254,430	187,804	10,472	108,442	297,934	303,669	295,607	291,235
Brunei	720	302	25	421	1,014	1,086	1,034	1,081
Chile	440,910	443,702	138,940	157,498	350,811	315,703	268,704	226,127
Croatia	25,690	14,474	—N/a	—N/a	—N/a	—N/a	—N/a	—N/a
Czech Republic	109,930	74,961	4,352	50,279	128,856	122,434	116,097	102,061
Denmark	230,350	173,843	6,471	124,274	317,683	338,063	345,070	335,158
Estonia	21,250	13,900	965	12,594	25,730	23,878	24,208	22,682
Finland	107,600	64,116	2,533	70,664	150,040	150,440	157,079	161,474
France	1,805,880	1,343,142	73,159	864,581	2,121,625	2,022,153	1,891,564	1,871,506
Germany	1,797,830	1,251,241	84,444	829,996	2,084,664	2,130,453	2,160,492	2,138,056
Greece	79,440	56,255	3,311	41,027	87,520	82,453	73,240	66,999
Hong Kong (Note: Visa waiver only for Guam and the Northern Mariana Islands.)	90	27	3	123	2,415	2,983	5,979	2,736
Hungary	76,250	53,325	3,115	47,966	110,906	98,060	90,997	81,320
Iceland	41,520	33,741	771	25,299	63,569	68,724	62,782	54,571
Ireland	506,140	366,153	10,226	245,669	588,911	576,099	521,641	491,963
Italy	1,139,330	769,705	104,633	494,102	1,333,908	1,315,270	1,248,156	1,234,097
Japan	1,207,480	338,837	49,627	1,590,287	3,615,829	3,509,759	3,672,493	3,696,408
Latvia	19,580	14,272	1,279	10,581	22,887	21,544	21,459	19,107
Liechtenstein	1,360	1,004	60	670	1,820	1,890	1,919	2,053
Lithuania	39,910	28,201	2,312	18,490	41,297	37,734	24,383	30,287
Luxembourg	13,660	9,371	431	5,101	14,864	14,196	13,008	14,195
Malaysia	110	54	7	152	488	416	609	255
Malta	8,210	4,900	451	3,117	8,157	6,999	6,252	6,000
Monaco	810	580	34	408	998	888	991	1,097
Nauru	40	≤236	0	≤32	22	28	5	9
Netherlands	630,430	480,942	52,601	317,788	813,888	812,905	777,886	751,482
New Zealand	287,080	103,279	7,039	121,474	338,162	345,102	338,371	322,001
Norway	168,460	110,403	3,387	97,091	263,579	276,912	290,688	274,958
Papua New Guinea	170	26	0	≤32	55	59	100	252
Poland	235,170	138,275	5,137	27,544	—N/a	—N/a	—N/a	—N/a
Portugal	194,360	137,241	12,290	86,176	207,772	205,780	185,010	174,040
San Marino	430	≤236	30	286	711	746	692	693
Singapore	124,240	66,714	4,286	63,290	149,381	138,013	133,627	132,204
Slovakia	44,960	32,200	2,060	22,414	59,527	53,181	49,399	46,692
Slovenia	23,050	14,521	1,521	13,719	30,275	27,019	25,015	24,197
South Korea	1,480,140	643,164	87,520	999,347	2,111,855	2,290,705	2,223,813	1,862,434
Spain	890,650	784,673	135,197	441,802	1,122,063	1,080,300	1,015,528	991,483
Sweden	283,960	198,093	8,566	204,290	466,465	529,534	554,600	572,385
Switzerland	302,680	215,053	19,137	145,192	387,285	403,095	416,944	438,061
Taiwan	277,940	74,654	24,790	165,869	440,995	442,622	419,748	388,629
United Kingdom	3,873,730	2,795,703	115,057	1,918,654	4,758,514	4,635,480	4,558,681	4,691,708
Total	17,861,310	11,625,987	1,008,194	9,939,927	24,102,240	24,007,315	23,637,046	23,132,817

=== Visa refusal rate ===
To qualify for the Visa Waiver Program, a country must have had a visa refusal rate of less than 3% for the previous year. This refusal rate is based on applications for B visas, for tourism and business purposes. B visas are adjudicated based on applicant interviews, which generally last between 60 and 90 seconds.

Refusal rates for B visas by country and fiscal year (Note: Refusal rates lower than the VWP requirement (10% for fiscal year 2008, or 3% for other years), for nationalities without visa waivers, are highlighted in green in the table. Refusal rates for nationalities with visa waivers are highlighted in yellow.)
Country	2025	2024	2023	2022	2021	2020	2019	2018	2017	2016	2015	2014	2013	2012	2011	2010	2009	2008
Afghanistan	63.25%	48.89%	48.73%	52.65%	72.09%	56.05%	68.42%	71.39%	72.14%	73.80%	61.03%	46.7%	62.7%	59.3%	45.7%	56.0%	59.6%	51.0%
Albania	37.32%	33.37%	31.10%	27.55%	10.78%	40.06%	41.45%	41.92%	40.45%	35.95%	36.82%	39.8%	40.4%	40.5%	42.3%	37.7%	39.6%	38.7%
Algeria	51.23%	50.72%	35.19%	18.10%	38.40%	49.69%	44.22%	39.26%	43.96%	36.00%	25.92%	23.1%	28.3%	24.2%	29.2%	21.9%	20.5%	20.3%
Andorra	9.09%	28.57%	22.22%	0.00%	— (Note: No B visa applications from nationals of this country were processed in this fiscal year.)	50.00%	12.50%	0.00%	—	28.57%	—	0.0%	25.0%	100.0%	0.0%	100.0%	60.0%	50.0%
Angola	54.33%	49.36%	48.94%	47.25%	58.52%	62.15%	58.26%	51.76%	36.01%	48.52%	26.77%	21.4%	24.8%	19.9%	17.2%	21.4%	17.7%	17.1%
Antigua and Barbuda	38.89%	26.74%	18.60%	14.09%	16.66%	23.44%	15.25%	19.07%	20.50%	22.11%	20.17%	20.8%	18.1%	24.1%	20.2%	19.7%	13.1%	21.7%
Argentina	7.47%	8.90%	8.21%	3.66%	2.31%	2.79%	2.07%	1.73%	1.79%	2.14%	2.14%	1.4%	1.7%	1.5%	2.5%	3.1%	3.3%	3.1%
Armenia	56.37%	59.46%	51.49%	37.87%	37.07%	56.47%	51.65%	53.83%	51.87%	45.88%	47.17%	43.8%	37.9%	38.5%	54.5%	51.4%	48.9%	53.3%
Australia	22.93%	20.67%	16.75%	12.55%	14.27%	18.74%	19.18%	17.99%	17.18%	15.38%	21.24%	20.1%	16.6%	16.6%	22.7%	23.7%	19.8%	16.5%
Austria	8.92%	9.94%	9.38%	6.97%	6.29%	8.91%	5.21%	5.39%	5.00%	5.93%	7.40%	7.8%	8.7%	11.1%	9.3%	11.5%	11.9%	20.3%
Azerbaijan	20.91%	21.46%	35.99%	23.54%	12.27%	26.41%	25.43%	28.45%	27.63%	14.83%	12.93%	13.5%	9.4%	11.4%	12.9%	13.5%	11.5%	14.0%
Bahamas	14.46%	12.81%	8.38%	8.30%	7.91%	12.59%	9.33%	12.51%	9.32%	9.35%	7.40%	9.2%	11.6%	12.9%	13.7%	8.2%	8.3%	5.9%
Bahrain	24.01%	17.83%	11.11%	28.41%	22.48%	9.04%	13.55%	6.96%	9.53%	6.26%	3.81%	4.7%	4.1%	7.7%	2.4%	4.1%	6.7%	6.6%
Bangladesh	61.45%	46.09%	43.66%	30.30%	29.91%	40.34%	39.78%	40.05%	60.88%	62.82%	59.96%	50.8%	43.5%	26.0%	42.4%	36.4%	34.1%	48.2%
Barbados	18.46%	10.81%	9.63%	6.55%	12.93%	10.79%	6.76%	7.07%	8.72%	11.24%	9.54%	9.8%	9.9%	12.4%	10.7%	10.2%	7.8%	10.1%
Belarus	26.58%	28.79%	32.80%	26.05%	16.81%	27.01%	21.93%	23.26%	21.69%	14.87%	12.53%	14.0%	20.7%	19.5%	19.4%	19.7%	15.5%	21.1%
Belgium	12.80%	11.65%	8.76%	8.73%	16.57%	16.47%	8.96%	9.77%	6.96%	7.33%	12.85%	11.7%	9.4%	7.1%	13.7%	13.2%	9.4%	13.4%
Belize	32.32%	29.48%	26.25%	26.45%	25.36%	23.31%	28.63%	34.55%	30.91%	35.21%	30.47%	16.4%	19.7%	22.7%	36.8%	33.4%	21.4%	25.4%
Benin	64.58%	61.49%	49.11%	40.57%	32.05%	45.27%	48.48%	47.74%	42.10%	38.01%	35.74%	31.4%	34.6%	33.0%	48.2%	39.7%	37.0%	39.1%
Bhutan	56.03%	49.46%	45.03%	34.55%	43.33%	53.56%	57.13%	59.63%	52.43%	69.78%	54.55%	43.6%	42.0%	52.2%	60.7%	64.1%	68.1%	48.3%
Bolivia	29.83%	28.93%	22.15%	17.15%	11.30%	20.36%	24.17%	22.19%	18.08%	14.36%	13.56%	13.6%	15.4%	16.3%	24.0%	23.8%	17.4%	23.6%
Bosnia and Herzegovina	14.89%	11.64%	18.49%	19.91%	21.84%	16.01%	25.27%	23.50%	16.37%	19.70%	20.38%	16.1%	26.5%	14.4%	10.1%	9.7%	13.9%	21.3%
Botswana	38.44%	32.44%	23.81%	11.19%	0.00%	19.26%	17.54%	18.67%	17.94%	18.97%	16.67%	16.9%	17.3%	12.5%	11.0%	13.9%	16.8%	15.6%
Brazil	14.87%	15.48%	11.94%	14.48%	14.25%	23.16%	18.48%	12.73%	12.34%	16.70%	5.36%	3.2%	3.5%	3.2%	3.8%	5.2%	7.0%	5.5%
Brunei	8.33%	4.00%	10.71%	5.41%	—	0.00%	4.76%	4.35%	3.70%	13.51%	6.82%	11.1%	20.7%	25.5%	8.0%	3.5%	5.6%	3.3%
Bulgaria	5.11%	6.02%	11.61%	10.00%	18.40%	12.52%	9.75%	11.32%	14.97%	16.86%	17.26%	15.2%	19.9%	18.0%	15.7%	17.2%	17.8%	13.3%
Burkina Faso	71.25%	58.03%	45.20%	39.25%	24.55%	62.86%	62.32%	71.16%	75.74%	65.35%	50.37%	37.4%	31.7%	35.3%	37.9%	45.8%	48.9%	44.4%
Burundi	69.23%	65.52%	66.29%	69.52%	53.23%	77.72%	73.16%	74.39%	75.55%	61.33%	58.35%	50.0%	52.7%	46.1%	45.5%	36.4%	52.2%	58.8%
Cambodia	30.71%	28.32%	25.95%	24.50%	35.62%	26.50%	33.65%	32.63%	41.05%	35.62%	48.41%	39.9%	28.9%	33.9%	44.0%	42.9%	47.2%	44.3%
Cameroon	60.55%	55.57%	58.62%	52.22%	39.93%	57.12%	57.97%	52.27%	47.29%	36.84%	29.89%	28.2%	37.3%	41.1%	40.6%	40.5%	48.3%	46.7%
Canada	53.10%	56.35%	52.04%	58.33%	51.81%	52.67%	43.76%	38.98%	41.14%	47.93%	49.13%	48.7%	43.1%	44.3%	52.2%	57.1%	52.8%	39.0%
Cape Verde	53.87%	52.02%	41.55%	33.68%	25.32%	42.74%	52.66%	54.22%	50.70%	45.89%	36.05%	28.7%	36.4%	36.6%	38.3%	46.3%	45.3%	42.7%
Central African Republic	42.60%	48.46%	56.67%	36.70%	36.36%	48.67%	37.45%	36.03%	44.24%	35.12%	32.43%	46.6%	46.4%	32.2%	47.4%	48.3%	45.0%	39.6%
Chad	61.63%	58.60%	42.50%	69.39%	72.77%	70.60%	70.16%	60.80%	51.65%	42.53%	33.87%	32.4%	36.3%	43.8%	42.7%	58.5%	37.6%	41.4%
Chile	16.38%	20.15%	16.12%	13.75%	13.42%	11.54%	15.32%	11.34%	13.87%	11.43%	13.66%	2.4%	1.6%	2.8%	3.4%	5.0%	5.9%	8.9%
China	20.21%	25.37%	26.63%	30.39%	79.09%	22.12%	18.22%	17.00%	14.57%	12.35%	10.03%	9.0%	8.5%	8.5%	12.0%	13.3%	15.6%	18.2%
Colombia	32.84%	24.70%	20.59%	32.86%	27.75%	46.82%	41.93%	35.11%	21.93%	17.79%	15.52%	12.3%	10.4%	11.2%	21.7%	30.7%	27.3%	25.6%
Comoros	30.19%	25.42%	33.33%	43.48%	73.68%	86.15%	53.02%	69.46%	48.45%	53.73%	54.44%	17.0%	32.6%	22.1%	29.6%	43.6%	24.5%	14.0%
Congo	64.75%	48.78%	49.65%	37.19%	63.82%	59.34%	60.49%	52.23%	48.47%	46.55%	40.77%	35.4%	27.5%	30.7%	25.2%	34.4%	33.0%	33.2%
Costa Rica	16.14%	12.66%	16.09%	12.71%	7.97%	24.77%	18.66%	9.91%	6.49%	8.39%	9.83%	11.4%	13.7%	11.3%	13.7%	17.7%	16.6%	21.2%
Croatia	14.75%	11.56%	9.32%	5.56%	4.65%	2.69%	4.02%	5.92%	5.10%	6.78%	5.29%	6.1%	5.9%	4.4%	6.3%	5.3%	5.3%	5.1%
Cuba	70.86%	53.35%	49.96%	56.51%	52.69%	60.15%	53.40%	50.97%	77.17%	81.85%	76.03%	66.2%	61.1%	38.7%	33.0%	20.5%	31.3%	45.2%
Cyprus	2.55%	2.16%	4.48%	6.22%	15.09%	6.21%	2.78%	2.38%	1.69%	2.03%	3.53%	3.5%	4.0%	1.9%	1.8%	1.7%	1.4%	1.7%
Czech Republic	8.66%	7.96%	8.05%	8.50%	16.24%	26.82%	12.41%	10.37%	6.81%	7.82%	6.33%	8.1%	5.8%	6.4%	6.4%	9.6%	6.9%	5.2%
Democratic Republic of the Congo	63.37%	46.77%	48.53%	43.93%	37.36%	58.03%	53.80%	50.56%	49.94%	45.63%	45.62%	39.1%	41.9%	37.4%	39.1%	40.8%	35.6%	36.2%
Denmark	12.59%	9.25%	10.66%	12.17%	31.11%	17.58%	14.26%	12.38%	13.18%	11.74%	20.73%	12.0%	11.0%	14.7%	17.0%	18.3%	13.6%	16.6%
Djibouti	61.47%	64.71%	68.37%	74.44%	88.34%	69.79%	85.35%	82.96%	74.80%	47.09%	52.00%	50.1%	62.6%	64.5%	58.0%	60.2%	42.1%	42.5%
Dominica	42.89%	35.41%	29.10%	25.00%	22.85%	30.38%	26.83%	37.13%	28.74%	31.63%	33.33%	29.0%	30.2%	31.7%	29.2%	27.5%	20.3%	29.5%
Dominican Republic	36.40%	43.38%	36.69%	15.75%	4.33%	39.18%	53.21%	49.54%	35.78%	31.88%	33.78%	35.9%	41.3%	32.0%	32.1%	31.2%	34.6%	45.6%
Ecuador	42.24%	36.99%	26.67%	17.51%	15.68%	33.44%	34.05%	31.38%	27.95%	29.18%	31.34%	20.8%	16.9%	18.5%	23.0%	27.1%	36.0%	40.0%
Egypt	47.61%	39.77%	26.11%	23.11%	23.81%	35.16%	31.83%	32.15%	34.24%	28.61%	33.57%	34.0%	39.5%	32.4%	24.0%	31.3%	29.7%	35.3%
El Salvador	58.22%	52.65%	57.91%	45.46%	20.63%	62.95%	58.18%	51.49%	52.97%	57.12%	45.72%	36.3%	45.1%	41.4%	47.1%	47.4%	52.1%	45.7%
Equatorial Guinea	68.63%	55.07%	40.35%	48.32%	74.13%	59.18%	27.79%	21.29%	18.21%	17.75%	19.30%	17.8%	16.2%	10.0%	6.6%	12.2%	8.2%	11.1%
Eritrea	60.02%	49.94%	61.97%	47.04%	55.96%	63.62%	65.39%	69.54%	71.69%	50.49%	55.67%	41.7%	40.5%	39.2%	46.2%	52.6%	48.2%	51.1%
Estonia	11.33%	9.79%	16.22%	21.43%	9.09%	32.65%	24.81%	26.73%	21.16%	20.74%	13.53%	16.4%	13.6%	14.9%	21.9%	29.3%	6.2%	3.9%
Eswatini	50.87%	38.44%	7.84%	9.30%	8.89%	5.52%	5.73%	8.49%	12.59%	8.03%	12.95%	10.0%	4.5%	4.9%	10.4%	9.0%	10.4%	13.0%
Ethiopia	53.64%	51.17%	41.20%	25.32%	7.52%	39.73%	45.46%	41.74%	50.30%	38.13%	48.32%	44.9%	35.6%	39.7%	41.7%	49.1%	50.6%	46.7%
Fiji	32.83%	35.25%	41.88%	45.36%	56.64%	44.44%	38.96%	41.74%	26.59%	20.23%	14.92%	14.0%	27.2%	26.9%	31.4%	33.8%	40.0%	38.0%
Finland	18.09%	14.49%	22.82%	13.07%	16.51%	14.03%	11.00%	15.05%	11.78%	7.72%	11.86%	14.5%	15.0%	7.6%	19.4%	15.4%	23.6%	17.1%
France	9.67%	8.50%	10.11%	12.55%	22.21%	21.58%	13.67%	10.11%	7.43%	7.30%	16.28%	18.8%	13.0%	13.4%	23.9%	14.5%	12.0%	8.7%
Gabon	44.63%	27.76%	29.62%	21.65%	31.25%	37.61%	45.41%	40.00%	26.10%	21.29%	15.74%	13.5%	20.3%	24.1%	30.3%	27.3%	23.8%	23.0%
Gambia	75.29%	66.03%	60.40%	50.64%	40.30%	66.84%	72.30%	64.22%	70.27%	69.87%	75.64%	69.3%	74.5%	73.5%	67.2%	56.2%	51.9%	55.7%
Georgia	45.57%	41.44%	49.23%	42.01%	63.04%	66.91%	63.85%	62.35%	61.09%	62.82%	50.58%	48.2%	38.3%	31.8%	40.2%	43.6%	49.7%	46.6%
Germany	12.22%	10.02%	10.84%	11.69%	24.82%	12.69%	9.30%	7.40%	5.91%	7.25%	10.87%	12.8%	12.8%	16.4%	18.6%	15.4%	16.0%	13.8%
Ghana	64.34%	55.59%	37.56%	27.66%	17.49%	57.01%	55.60%	49.35%	56.18%	65.70%	63.28%	59.8%	61.8%	61.7%	59.3%	58.0%	54.3%	50.1%
Greece	9.30%	10.16%	15.57%	14.95%	10.86%	18.58%	14.99%	16.93%	13.14%	16.37%	21.89%	27.1%	26.0%	26.1%	14.8%	2.6%	2.0%	1.5%
Grenada	43.73%	33.13%	20.37%	16.58%	19.63%	24.76%	19.49%	26.44%	26.94%	35.71%	32.00%	29.5%	25.8%	32.5%	26.6%	29.6%	19.5%	29.9%
Guatemala	39.21%	30.84%	21.55%	5.45%	7.26%	52.36%	58.64%	53.62%	47.14%	48.68%	45.37%	35.9%	37.7%	30.9%	30.2%	28.0%	29.7%	33.8%
Guinea	66.90%	70.25%	61.37%	53.56%	61.26%	63.79%	73.29%	66.16%	64.59%	63.53%	59.81%	47.8%	52.5%	54.2%	60.6%	66.0%	67.8%	63.8%
Guinea-Bissau	75.17%	76.59%	48.15%	60.91%	62.50%	66.36%	65.33%	76.09%	71.61%	71.88%	65.18%	56.5%	43.6%	50.0%	55.0%	46.6%	61.9%	63.4%
Guyana	26.61%	34.25%	39.22%	28.42%	36.76%	62.20%	62.96%	70.62%	37.92%	25.76%	37.28%	40.2%	52.7%	46.5%	51.5%	63.5%	55.9%	56.6%
Haiti	50.26%	47.35%	47.94%	47.12%	45.87%	50.16%	60.81%	67.59%	71.44%	64.52%	60.45%	58.2%	47.1%	54.0%	58.2%	49.0%	61.4%	54.4%
Honduras	46.52%	42.61%	33.79%	30.47%	12.38%	52.10%	61.71%	60.32%	40.35%	42.76%	39.73%	36.8%	37.0%	29.8%	27.6%	29.2%	29.2%	33.6%
Hong Kong (BNO)	—N/a	—N/a	—N/a	—N/a	—N/a	—N/a	—N/a	—N/a	—N/a	—N/a	—N/a	—N/a	2.4%	2.6%	3.6%	5.0%	5.0%	3.3%
Hong Kong (SAR)	7.72%	6.16%	5.49%	4.88%	5.28%	4.50%	3.23%	4.25%	3.45%	4.61%	4.36%	3.1%	1.8%	1.7%	3.9%	5.4%	6.9%	4.4%
Hungary	7.91%	5.93%	7.29%	8.44%	16.67%	16.36%	8.85%	10.53%	13.04%	15.48%	31.31%	35.5%	31.6%	17.0%	31.1%	34.5%	21.1%	7.8%
Iceland	5.43%	5.80%	4.54%	3.24%	25.00%	18.98%	9.44%	7.14%	7.46%	7.69%	8.11%	10.2%	7.1%	5.6%	8.6%	9.8%	6.3%	5.1%
India	22.04%	16.32%	10.99%	6.54%	12.25%	27.26%	27.75%	26.07%	23.29%	26.02%	23.78%	19.8%	18.7%	24.1%	30.1%	26.8%	28.7%	24.7%
Indonesia	26.69%	20.09%	10.95%	12.23%	5.83%	12.19%	12.46%	12.81%	10.99%	11.19%	8.71%	8.3%	8.0%	12.1%	14.2%	16.4%	25.0%	37.0%
Iran	62.44%	55.54%	53.26%	54.09%	66.81%	85.88%	86.58%	87.66%	58.66%	45.02%	38.55%	41.8%	48.2%	37.6%	31.0%	38.9%	40.1%	42.5%
Iraq	39.86%	33.44%	37.09%	44.63%	36.48%	45.24%	49.94%	56.95%	60.71%	51.71%	52.82%	41.4%	39.2%	32.8%	27.3%	42.2%	31.8%	46.3%
Ireland	25.12%	22.19%	19.41%	21.32%	40.00%	26.07%	22.69%	21.77%	17.89%	15.48%	18.34%	19.6%	16.9%	21.1%	23.3%	25.1%	24.2%	20.0%
Israel	11.32%	8.64%	3.30%	2.27%	4.92%	6.52%	5.33%	5.10%	4.88%	4.09%	3.85%	8.2%	8.6%	5.4%	6.9%	6.4%	5.1%	3.0%
Italy	12.65%	10.89%	10.62%	9.75%	15.86%	20.82%	15.03%	14.83%	12.54%	10.86%	22.10%	22.9%	15.2%	13.3%	18.3%	16.1%	11.1%	9.3%
Ivory Coast	36.79%	30.08%	24.85%	23.08%	25.33%	40.66%	35.73%	33.81%	33.72%	37.38%	28.59%	29.8%	30.3%	27.7%	39.6%	47.0%	36.5%	40.9%
Jamaica	44.26%	43.67%	40.29%	30.04%	19.13%	57.07%	56.59%	54.46%	46.78%	35.64%	37.62%	32.3%	35.3%	41.6%	45.7%	47.4%	46.4%	35.5%
Japan	5.68%	5.76%	6.05%	5.79%	4.69%	10.43%	10.48%	9.76%	8.47%	8.12%	12.22%	9.3%	10.9%	10.2%	18.7%	15.0%	16.0%	14.8%
Jordan	56.63%	45.86%	28.51%	27.90%	38.09%	44.44%	45.26%	42.62%	40.06%	40.34%	37.59%	26.9%	32.6%	30.8%	34.5%	40.1%	31.4%	43.2%
Kazakhstan	51.75%	46.29%	41.93%	44.02%	43.29%	47.34%	42.58%	39.38%	32.81%	27.55%	12.70%	9.9%	8.0%	7.5%	8.3%	9.4%	12.2%	11.7%
Kenya	68.23%	63.32%	51.68%	42.02%	34.86%	50.26%	49.86%	41.59%	33.17%	26.60%	27.34%	27.3%	28.3%	33.6%	39.3%	40.2%	35.8%	35.6%
Kiribati	4.50%	10.81%	20.55%	30.43%	50.00%	55.56%	11.69%	25.33%	5.13%	5.81%	16.05%	15.4%	27.3%	22.9%	20.7%	20.9%	10.2%	26.2%
Kosovo	35.00%	36.52%	29.79%	17.93%	12.51%	39.47%	36.76%	35.97%	37.92%	41.48%	44.03%	38.1%	40.0%	31.7%	29.0%	25.4%	29.0%	47.9%
Kuwait	6.06%	5.50%	3.96%	16.04%	18.18%	5.01%	3.27%	2.71%	8.32%	4.56%	5.73%	5.7%	10.3%	4.8%	2.8%	3.6%	−2.2%	6.5%
Kyrgyzstan	59.02%	39.14%	41.54%	37.85%	44.00%	65.60%	67.75%	58.90%	55.58%	51.68%	55.75%	43.2%	24.9%	26.4%	18.0%	17.5%	32.8%	32.1%
Laos	84.35%	82.84%	72.79%	56.20%	89.86%	70.57%	65.60%	64.06%	63.66%	62.37%	66.68%	61.1%	61.4%	60.1%	74.8%	74.4%	72.4%	73.4%
Latvia	19.00%	7.67%	9.28%	9.95%	15.91%	23.01%	18.98%	15.24%	12.83%	13.45%	18.40%	23.3%	20.4%	23.4%	29.7%	33.9%	19.5%	8.3%
Lebanon	39.42%	35.03%	38.78%	39.40%	52.21%	28.44%	23.85%	25.22%	31.75%	25.41%	27.10%	16.1%	15.1%	18.1%	20.9%	22.4%	18.6%	27.9%
Lesotho	38.24%	29.57%	25.82%	22.22%	50.00%	26.74%	28.24%	21.94%	35.97%	21.20%	13.95%	16.7%	19.4%	11.2%	18.6%	21.1%	17.7%	32.1%
Liberia	73.01%	79.38%	78.19%	62.73%	54.17%	67.62%	73.93%	64.36%	64.98%	70.23%	62.45%	49.4%	59.0%	45.5%	56.1%	57.6%	66.0%	70.7%
Libya	31.78%	24.64%	19.41%	22.78%	24.26%	80.90%	89.05%	73.73%	45.50%	40.58%	43.02%	33.9%	33.8%	38.9%	30.8%	14.3%	19.2%	27.1%
Liechtenstein	0.00%	0.00%	0.00%	12.50%	25.00%	0.00%	0.00%	0.00%	0.00%	0.00%	0.00%	11.1%	10.0%	0.0%	0.0%	5.9%	12.5%	0.0%
Lithuania	21.32%	21.04%	13.40%	14.81%	15.91%	21.96%	18.67%	17.29%	22.54%	22.36%	33.49%	37.7%	33.1%	34.0%	34.7%	31.9%	17.6%	9.0%
Luxembourg	13.77%	10.86%	4.22%	7.84%	0.00%	7.41%	10.22%	5.19%	5.74%	7.69%	5.88%	12.2%	8.3%	4.7%	5.5%	7.0%	10.0%	7.8%
Macau	13.13%	9.85%	11.57%	20.17%	12.50%	7.12%	5.03%	7.79%	5.38%	7.71%	9.30%	—N/a	3.1%	2.3%	8.9%	12.0%	16.4%	14.2%
Madagascar	17.23%	13.12%	12.07%	13.24%	21.82%	14.36%	7.69%	11.77%	11.00%	12.12%	11.01%	11.6%	9.3%	17.5%	15.0%	15.7%	18.2%	11.9%
Malawi	53.42%	47.78%	39.25%	38.54%	12.12%	42.67%	37.05%	28.20%	26.49%	14.52%	10.23%	12.3%	13.8%	16.5%	26.9%	26.9%	27.1%	28.9%
Malaysia	7.92%	6.79%	4.43%	9.41%	7.21%	6.97%	4.91%	4.94%	3.93%	3.65%	3.34%	4.6%	5.0%	5.4%	4.7%	5.9%	6.6%	5.6%
Maldives	10.60%	25.82%	14.66%	23.65%	66.67%	22.88%	33.65%	39.88%	27.74%	47.56%	15.49%	6.7%	22.9%	42.2%	0.9%	12.2%	19.7%	4.7%
Mali	55.57%	60.90%	60.16%	64.08%	62.96%	55.99%	55.89%	50.60%	59.43%	57.58%	52.77%	54.0%	47.7%	54.7%	51.0%	55.7%	52.8%	48.1%
Malta	10.30%	12.43%	10.56%	10.78%	16.67%	28.38%	17.76%	9.59%	4.81%	8.38%	7.87%	11.1%	6.6%	17.6%	11.9%	12.5%	3.8%	2.5%
Marshall Islands	35.71%	63.16%	31.58%	0.00%	0.00%	45.45%	30.77%	17.39%	5.88%	29.41%	26.67%	4.8%	22.7%	15.6%	8.3%	10.4%	7.3%	14.0%
Mauritania	67.61%	70.07%	76.43%	89.72%	83.14%	80.15%	67.79%	61.58%	67.30%	71.45%	61.45%	52.2%	50.0%	54.7%	61.5%	49.7%	54.1%	51.0%
Mauritius	7.35%	6.27%	6.90%	7.77%	9.92%	6.22%	6.59%	6.49%	8.29%	5.53%	5.71%	2.2%	4.7%	5.0%	7.5%	6.0%	7.2%	11.6%
Mexico	21.36%	13.87%	10.57%	5.91%	4.23%	23.16%	26.66%	24.93%	22.50%	23.49%	20.17%	15.6%	12.1%	10.6%	12.8%	11.1%	10.9%	11.4%
Micronesia	100.00%	—	100.00%	100.00%	—	—	100.00%	100.00%	100.00%	25.00%	85.71%	80.0%	100.0%	50.0%	33.3%	0.0%	100.0%	50.0%
Moldova	44.76%	46.99%	42.42%	43.57%	66.37%	51.00%	58.03%	61.10%	49.12%	36.35%	41.83%	40.1%	33.6%	31.0%	34.7%	38.5%	41.3%	36.7%
Monaco	0.00%	0.00%	0.00%	0.00%	—	50.00%	22.22%	0.00%	0.00%	—	12.50%	0.0%	33.3%	57.1%	0.0%	0.0%	0.0%	25.0%
Mongolia	31.28%	39.36%	37.34%	38.32%	39.57%	45.47%	54.60%	56.51%	53.62%	43.63%	34.76%	27.9%	30.6%	37.0%	44.5%	37.1%	34.9%	53.6%
Montenegro	33.41%	36.48%	43.59%	34.03%	9.30%	58.53%	39.10%	35.35%	26.41%	28.69%	31.26%	28.0%	32.6%	31.4%	39.0%	36.6%	27.5%	25.6%
Morocco	26.91%	14.45%	15.92%	21.90%	20.85%	23.35%	28.48%	42.88%	36.99%	26.77%	20.60%	21.9%	23.3%	21.3%	15.1%	15.5%	19.6%	24.0%
Mozambique	24.75%	34.75%	22.23%	20.48%	32.75%	18.64%	14.24%	10.22%	26.18%	10.29%	4.03%	4.0%	2.2%	3.2%	2.6%	6.7%	11.4%	13.8%
Myanmar	64.19%	62.58%	43.67%	46.15%	39.40%	40.68%	30.91%	23.12%	17.88%	13.02%	16.32%	15.5%	23.5%	31.0%	33.2%	32.0%	34.2%	41.9%
Namibia	16.54%	21.95%	22.40%	12.05%	10.71%	5.20%	6.60%	8.40%	6.31%	5.56%	7.43%	7.6%	6.2%	8.8%	8.9%	14.9%	10.8%	6.8%
Nauru	24.14%	0.00%	10.00%	66.67%	—N/a	25.00%	20.83%	21.43%	20.97%	13.33%	5.26%	42.9%	0.0%	18.2%	16.7%	41.7%	60.0%	66.7%
Nepal	69.47%	49.47%	31.03%	19.85%	18.72%	48.11%	50.70%	51.53%	46.42%	49.54%	42.19%	38.2%	46.4%	49.4%	59.9%	58.3%	59.1%	51.2%
Netherlands	17.42%	14.79%	16.81%	16.97%	25.28%	12.89%	11.82%	9.56%	9.65%	16.62%	13.01%	14.4%	11.2%	23.1%	21.1%	19.2%	18.0%	13.7%
New Zealand	21.94%	22.79%	13.28%	12.52%	12.74%	14.47%	16.32%	19.97%	22.02%	15.45%	16.94%	15.1%	14.0%	13.3%	19.3%	19.0%	16.1%	14.0%
Nicaragua	53.15%	58.71%	65.60%	50.81%	12.72%	63.17%	63.52%	46.75%	43.28%	44.54%	41.19%	35.8%	26.7%	27.6%	30.1%	33.8%	35.1%	41.8%
Niger	38.23%	38.18%	30.76%	43.67%	61.39%	53.50%	42.76%	43.33%	30.65%	31.14%	31.10%	36.4%	27.5%	35.9%	41.3%	41.3%	44.1%	55.7%
Nigeria	57.00%	46.51%	29.23%	25.80%	43.78%	64.83%	67.20%	57.47%	44.95%	41.44%	32.56%	33.2%	35.1%	33.6%	38.0%	33.7%	37.3%	36.0%
North Korea	33.33%	—N/a	100.00%	—N/a	100.00%	—N/a	100.00%	100.00%	54.55%	15.00%	47.67%	55.6%	28.6%	36.0%	8.3%	23.3%	4.0%	16.3%
North Macedonia	25.55%	28.00%	29.13%	26.29%	12.31%	29.62%	36.19%	31.29%	28.69%	33.84%	36.08%	29.8%	27.0%	20.7%	19.6%	20.0%	21.5%	33.5%
Norway	16.18%	19.44%	17.96%	16.53%	8.65%	17.07%	17.35%	12.40%	17.36%	21.96%	25.12%	21.4%	19.1%	17.8%	18.1%	17.2%	15.2%	11.9%
Oman	3.14%	4.50%	4.76%	18.45%	16.45%	6.32%	5.13%	4.87%	3.46%	1.93%	2.00%	2.1%	2.3%	4.5%	5.7%	8.7%	2.8%	2.2%
Pakistan	52.32%	45.65%	40.82%	31.43%	32.53%	45.62%	48.26%	47.89%	49.40%	46.43%	40.40%	38.0%	38.5%	37.3%	40.0%	41.6%	40.7%	46.3%
Palau	80.00%	63.64%	100.00%	66.67%	—	40.00%	100.00%	71.43%	83.33%	53.33%	96.00%	84.2%	29.2%	35.7%	57.1%	54.5%	0.0%	20.0%
Palestine	60.26%	44.51%	34.77%	33.96%	50.80%	58.27%	52.92%	53.87%	50.98%	40.64%	42.68%	36.7%	37.6%	38.9%	34.2%	36.2%	45.2%	55.6%
Panama	6.51%	19.93%	23.95%	13.54%	8.29%	15.33%	18.93%	11.71%	11.61%	12.05%	11.36%	10.0%	8.0%	8.4%	11.3%	11.2%	13.1%	19.2%
Papua New Guinea	10.57%	3.85%	6.15%	4.93%	3.45%	6.64%	1.74%	6.84%	9.34%	10.56%	5.14%	7.4%	3.1%	2.95%	5.0%	3.7%	5.7%	3.4%
Paraguay	18.71%	18.09%	16.00%	17.95%	13.33%	16.80%	12.41%	8.02%	6.83%	7.47%	6.15%	6.1%	4.4%	4.6%	7.6%	9.3%	9.8%	14.4%
Peru	20.90%	21.30%	24.23%	27.61%	4.11%	24.13%	25.39%	28.53%	25.97%	28.61%	14.46%	13.8%	16.1%	20.1%	22.7%	26.0%	29.1%	37.7%
Philippines	30.76%	28.33%	23.93%	11.59%	10.20%	32.49%	24.40%	27.07%	25.54%	27.29%	27.96%	24.6%	24.1%	23.8%	33.8%	37.9%	35.9%	31.0%
Poland	11.63%	10.99%	16.47%	14.74%	18.48%	8.91%	2.76%	3.99%	5.92%	5.37%	6.37%	6.4%	10.8%	9.3%	10.2%	9.8%	13.5%	13.8%
Portugal	8.19%	7.91%	10.52%	9.41%	17.86%	9.75%	6.52%	7.28%	11.06%	8.97%	8.41%	4.7%	9.9%	10.3%	16.2%	17.7%	17.4%	10.7%
Qatar	9.69%	4.67%	2.53%	12.86%	11.69%	8.28%	10.33%	8.34%	7.48%	3.50%	2.97%	2.1%	1.8%	1.2%	0.6%	3.2%	3.4%	4.9%
Romania	8.41%	2.61%	8.79%	12.61%	17.03%	10.14%	9.11%	10.44%	11.76%	11.43%	11.16%	9.8%	11.5%	17.0%	22.4%	24.8%	26.3%	25.0%
Russia	40.38%	38.56%	39.49%	26.18%	29.42%	17.79%	15.19%	14.89%	11.61%	9.29%	10.24%	7.8%	10.2%	9.6%	10.3%	10.1%	4.9%	7.5%
Rwanda	64.71%	55.76%	71.09%	62.92%	34.96%	63.93%	53.76%	44.51%	52.17%	43.79%	49.17%	51.1%	44.9%	30.9%	40.6%	48.1%	53.2%	50.3%
Saint Kitts and Nevis	35.09%	26.64%	20.95%	17.14%	19.35%	23.28%	21.87%	24.98%	26.66%	28.31%	26.60%	27.5%	30.7%	27.2%	23.3%	22.7%	16.1%	25.0%
Saint Lucia	37.03%	26.82%	16.60%	16.72%	17.47%	23.31%	16.75%	21.90%	22.34%	27.16%	26.90%	27.6%	22.5%	28.2%	25.4%	23.8%	17.2%	26.6%
Saint Vincent and the Grenadines	37.34%	26.64%	16.99%	14.12%	15.08%	21.10%	14.55%	19.77%	20.38%	27.46%	27.15%	24.1%	22.5%	27.2%	25.8%	27.2%	17.1%	26.4%
Samoa	44.33%	45.75%	34.37%	29.52%	32.58%	36.87%	27.02%	26.26%	40.32%	28.44%	29.99%	27.2%	22.1%	29.5%	41.7%	37.0%	22.4%	32.4%
San Marino	20.00%	9.09%	33.33%	0.00%	—	0.00%	50.00%	25.00%	0.00%	0.00%	—	100.0%	0.0%	0.0%	—	0.0%	0.0%	50.0%
São Tomé and Príncipe	25.00%	50.00%	46.67%	21.43%	20.00%	36.36%	34.78%	26.09%	14.81%	24.14%	5.71%	10.7%	22.2%	18.0%	31.7%	16.7%	33.3%	28.6%
Saudi Arabia	5.98%	7.89%	5.01%	14.29%	13.43%	10.01%	6.82%	7.47%	5.26%	4.04%	3.24%	3.3%	7.8%	7.6%	6.3%	6.0%	3.8%	6.6%
Senegal	73.96%	74.65%	70.47%	66.48%	34.95%	65.28%	55.88%	59.18%	56.85%	52.46%	54.37%	57.5%	53.2%	67.0%	62.8%	59.6%	60.2%	55.2%
Serbia	15.20%	17.77%	16.53%	19.45%	13.27%	25.01%	30.33%	25.93%	22.33%	18.77%	16.54%	16.0%	14.7%	13.7%	15.7%	14.5%	11.0%	11.7%
Serbia and Montenegro	—N/a	—N/a	—N/a	—N/a	—N/a	—N/a	—N/a	—N/a	—N/a	—N/a	—N/a	100.0%	100.0%	39.7%	16.2%	14.7%	12.0%	17.1%
Seychelles	13.22%	7.59%	4.55%	10.26%	0.00%	6.38%	10.60%	11.64%	13.14%	9.66%	7.26%	6.8%	4.3%	4.8%	15.9%	8.5%	21.3%	18.0%
Sierra Leone	70.55%	69.36%	49.02%	45.16%	35.70%	59.35%	57.99%	60.56%	47.30%	61.25%	53.02%	51.9%	46.5%	50.3%	48.0%	45.7%	52.6%	50.1%
Singapore	18.64%	10.40%	15.22%	10.10%	9.72%	10.17%	18.07%	14.29%	13.74%	15.10%	17.82%	16.6%	25.0%	24.6%	22.7%	16.6%	16.0%	11.7%
Slovakia	14.33%	11.58%	11.49%	15.86%	10.87%	28.08%	11.99%	16.21%	13.30%	12.28%	11.14%	17.3%	15.3%	13.5%	16.6%	11.8%	8.3%	5.3%
Slovenia	14.57%	12.42%	13.86%	13.47%	15.19%	17.11%	12.33%	12.33%	19.22%	10.43%	10.56%	7.0%	12.1%	23.4%	14.4%	28.5%	7.8%	6.7%
Solomon Islands	7.84%	5.00%	4.35%	7.69%	0.00%	9.09%	2.20%	3.57%	16.79%	4.28%	7.26%	5.4%	12.7%	5.4%	13.1%	10.7%	17.0%	6.5%
Somalia	83.52%	77.02%	69.89%	73.97%	66.67%	71.76%	80.77%	90.16%	75.50%	63.89%	64.60%	52.0%	65.8%	61.7%	66.8%	69.6%	73.4%	54.0%
South Africa	11.66%	10.65%	11.27%	9.68%	17.67%	7.80%	6.92%	7.31%	6.44%	6.83%	5.08%	2.6%	2.6%	2.9%	4.6%	4.1%	3.8%	4.6%
South Korea	24.73%	14.97%	14.44%	17.38%	18.03%	8.46%	7.69%	7.96%	9.05%	8.65%	13.21%	21.2%	18.1%	13.0%	7.5%	9.4%	5.5%	3.8%
South Sudan	76.09%	60.35%	48.94%	49.04%	45.71%	53.36%	52.32%	41.29%	47.52%	43.89%	41.77%	43.8%	41.9%	37.7%	23.8%	—N/a	—N/a	—N/a
Spain	23.67%	16.39%	15.66%	10.75%	18.29%	20.17%	16.53%	14.04%	17.26%	15.09%	17.76%	15.8%	16.0%	10.2%	6.6%	6.5%	7.7%	9.9%
Sri Lanka	33.35%	29.76%	26.61%	22.13%	25.34%	36.00%	35.12%	33.61%	26.19%	21.69%	22.07%	19.5%	20.6%	34.7%	25.2%	28.6%	40.8%	31.4%
Sudan	63.26%	54.59%	49.34%	38.83%	40.90%	50.25%	57.44%	59.83%	51.37%	36.59%	40.45%	42.4%	47.9%	45.4%	40.6%	32.5%	62.2%	38.6%
Suriname	14.28%	13.63%	14.44%	11.91%	6.42%	10.83%	7.44%	8.57%	11.44%	10.86%	7.78%	13.6%	9.6%	11.6%	18.0%	18.6%	15.5%	9.6%
Sweden	21.77%	21.46%	20.68%	17.07%	39.46%	18.35%	13.32%	15.20%	13.92%	12.78%	23.19%	15.4%	21.0%	16.3%	22.3%	20.5%	19.3%	15.2%
Switzerland	5.82%	5.39%	5.36%	3.05%	18.92%	10.92%	7.20%	5.50%	5.89%	5.20%	4.62%	7.2%	4.4%	3.6%	4.2%	3.3%	2.8%	3.4%
Syria	50.69%	45.84%	47.42%	42.87%	44.04%	66.68%	74.83%	77.31%	59.11%	59.77%	63.43%	60.0%	46.1%	42.0%	32.8%	28.4%	23.6%	33.1%
Taiwan	9.45%	5.22%	4.92%	4.56%	12.65%	5.02%	4.62%	6.80%	5.42%	5.36%	8.81%	12.3%	6.9%	1.4%	1.9%	2.2%	4.4%	5.9%
Tajikistan	47.83%	45.24%	54.96%	57.93%	57.24%	59.55%	60.97%	53.39%	51.84%	55.24%	44.44%	49.0%	53.7%	42.6%	30.3%	31.4%	23.8%	32.4%
Tanzania	39.41%	36.69%	34.13%	29.37%	7.27%	31.04%	23.90%	19.87%	18.36%	23.05%	12.02%	21.3%	25.7%	15.8%	27.5%	24.2%	28.3%	26.2%
Thailand	25.67%	22.50%	24.34%	24.36%	31.82%	24.44%	23.41%	22.17%	20.15%	17.82%	12.35%	10.2%	11.1%	10.2%	11.4%	13.5%	16.4%	19.8%
Timor-Leste	20.45%	6.25%	8.51%	0.00%	0.00%	21.43%	4.23%	8.16%	7.02%	26.67%	12.68%	25.0%	5.6%	16.7%	25.5%	13.3%	17.5%	16.7%
Togo	72.02%	66.60%	55.13%	43.87%	16.98%	62.32%	59.78%	59.61%	59.88%	54.39%	43.42%	35.6%	44.0%	37.7%	35.8%	42.1%	42.6%	51.7%
Tonga	47.21%	47.33%	50.61%	51.27%	46.67%	48.15%	45.85%	51.33%	32.85%	31.58%	28.09%	25.4%	42.1%	41.5%	46.5%	42.8%	47.8%	48.7%
Trinidad and Tobago	14.92%	18.18%	16.62%	13.64%	7.05%	14.10%	13.05%	19.28%	22.46%	22.70%	25.16%	21.2%	20.6%	18.7%	19.3%	32.0%	33.1%	23.8%
Tunisia	25.89%	23.21%	26.14%	21.06%	24.92%	19.11%	24.17%	27.67%	19.53%	15.92%	19.69%	17.5%	17.0%	16.8%	17.2%	15.6%	18.5%	23.9%
Turkey	22.25%	19.78%	20.59%	19.96%	13.70%	17.46%	19.19%	17.49%	17.86%	13.62%	13.88%	7.1%	10.3%	8.1%	7.0%	9.1%	9.0%	11.2%
Turkmenistan	64.74%	58.80%	51.10%	35.69%	32.00%	58.55%	56.26%	52.93%	40.60%	32.95%	25.41%	18.6%	16.3%	17.7%	24.3%	20.6%	19.8%	45.4%
Tuvalu	4.55%	8.33%	22.22%	27.27%	0.00%	33.33%	25.81%	34.78%	15.38%	20.00%	21.05%	27.3%	71.4%	21.4%	32.0%	38.1%	28.6%	17.6%
Uganda	57.58%	47.29%	47.13%	42.15%	38.70%	49.82%	51.65%	42.29%	42.38%	41.53%	30.63%	37.2%	32.7%	33.2%	37.3%	36.3%	38.8%	34.4%
Ukraine	33.92%	33.45%	34.29%	41.27%	15.15%	43.14%	45.06%	40.97%	34.54%	40.83%	34.03%	27.7%	26.7%	26.9%	29.0%	31.8%	36.8%	30.9%
United Arab Emirates	2.17%	1.46%	4.18%	10.06%	8.93%	8.44%	5.56%	3.75%	5.80%	4.02%	7.10%	4.8%	8.0%	9.0%	5.7%	9.7%	9.6%	10.4%
United Kingdom	20.44%	18.03%	14.69%	15.55%	11.97%	23.58%	21.05%	20.29%	20.15%	20.42%	20.41%	19.4%	16.9%	20.6%	27.3%	25.5%	27.8%	25.5%
Uruguay	2.59%	2.63%	3.21%	5.70%	8.82%	9.77%	5.91%	4.11%	3.19%	3.14%	2.70%	1.8%	2.8%	2.7%	3.8%	5.6%	5.4%	9.5%
Uzbekistan	52.46%	64.41%	59.56%	47.04%	45.98%	74.14%	68.06%	61.76%	50.29%	57.09%	49.59%	52.1%	44.3%	40.4%	50.2%	46.8%	41.1%	61.1%
Vanuatu	46.88%	46.23%	38.84%	36.09%	33.33%	46.34%	41.05%	38.30%	13.51%	16.67%	10.53%	20.0%	14.9%	12.5%	15.0%	13.3%	20.0%	16.7%
Vatican City	0.00%	0.00%	14.29%	14.29%	—N/a	0.00%	8.33%	0.00%	36.36%	0.00%	25.00%	7.7%	33.3%	0.0%	11.8%	14.3%	7.1%	16.7%
Venezuela	48.22%	37.40%	34.88%	34.01%	27.22%	52.30%	59.53%	74.28%	42.87%	40.25%	15.57%	15.2%	13.8%	12.0%	16.1%	17.6%	18.3%	25.4%
Vietnam	22.08%	22.12%	25.78%	14.98%	11.32%	18.78%	23.70%	26.20%	24.06%	29.49%	23.43%	14.3%	20.3%	22.2%	33.5%	36.1%	42.3%	38.8%
Western Sahara	—N/a	—N/a	—N/a	—N/a	—N/a	—N/a	—N/a	—N/a	100.00%	—N/a	—N/a	—N/a	—N/a	—N/a	—N/a	—N/a	—N/a	—N/a
Yemen	67.98%	58.07%	57.16%	56.14%	54.30%	76.66%	78.45%	82.50%	60.76%	48.85%	54.01%	44.2%	44.0%	47.8%	48.4%	54.3%	47.3%	54.7%
Zambia	52.45%	44.97%	32.36%	33.22%	16.54%	44.78%	40.64%	22.45%	21.72%	22.26%	20.98%	22.2%	26.2%	22.9%	22.1%	23.1%	38.9%	53.3%
Zimbabwe	37.60%	39.47%	34.55%	26.76%	9.31%	29.41%	26.92%	26.60%	26.32%	22.88%	21.03%	13.2%	19.7%	19.2%	21.8%	28.1%	31.3%	30.3%
Unknown or stateless	37.40%	41.41%	43.95%	45.44%	49.74%	46.06%	43.16%	40.27%	35.61%	28.92%	32.62%	32.3%	27.0%	31.6%	39.2%	42.4%	50.2%	51.6%

=== Overstay rate ===
The table below shows the overstay rate, which is the portion of visitors arriving under the Visa Waiver Program who remained in the United States longer than the maximum allowed stay of 90 days. Some of these visitors later left the United States or legalized their immigration status.

Overstay rate by country and fiscal year
Country	2024	2023	2022	2021	2020	2019	2018	2017	2016	2015
Andorra	1.12%	0.91%	1.32%	0.00%	0.43%	0.63%	0.19%	0.44%	0.69%	0.41%
Australia	0.33%	0.38%	0.92%	2.38%	0.48%	0.37%	0.28%	0.39%	0.56%	0.37%
Austria	0.32%	0.37%	0.61%	1.37%	0.70%	0.38%	0.34%	0.41%	1.37%	1.33%
Belgium	0.32%	0.35%	0.65%	1.64%	0.53%	0.36%	0.31%	0.55%	0.54%	0.56%
Brunei	0.81%	1.00%	2.12%	4.55%	2.14%	0.99%	0.78%	1.29%	0.98%	0.96%
Chile	2.32%	2.62%	2.97%	3.94%	1.76%	1.34%	1.49%	1.33%	1.71%	2.33%
Croatia	0.45%	0.51%	1.34%	—N/a	—N/a	—N/a	—N/a	—N/a	—N/a	—N/a
Czech Republic	0.39%	0.52%	0.88%	2.90%	0.77%	0.51%	0.63%	0.80%	1.11%	1.65%
Denmark	0.26%	0.26%	0.40%	0.98%	0.43%	0.29%	0.23%	0.40%	0.50%	0.60%
Estonia	0.50%	0.38%	0.95%	3.75%	0.67%	0.61%	0.47%	0.72%	0.84%	1.16%
Finland	0.30%	0.24%	0.38%	0.86%	0.53%	0.35%	0.23%	0.45%	0.46%	0.55%
France	0.53%	0.55%	0.81%	2.17%	0.79%	0.55%	0.60%	0.91%	0.68%	0.76%
Germany	0.28%	0.35%	0.60%	1.59%	0.47%	0.39%	0.32%	0.51%	0.98%	1.07%
Greece	0.98%	1.24%	2.62%	4.82%	1.71%	1.27%	1.26%	1.71%	2.19%	2.31%
Hungary	0.71%	1.19%	2.02%	6.50%	1.24%	1.03%	1.26%	2.04%	2.75%	2.92%
Iceland	0.15%	0.16%	0.27%	1.57%	0.33%	0.28%	0.21%	0.33%	0.33%	0.46%
Ireland	0.32%	0.37%	0.52%	2.27%	0.42%	0.29%	0.31%	0.50%	0.53%	0.47%
Israel	0.80%	—N/a	—N/a	—N/a	—N/a	—N/a	—N/a	—N/a	—N/a	—N/a
Italy	0.71%	0.81%	2.25%	3.91%	0.86%	0.63%	0.54%	0.83%	1.36%	1.60%
Japan	0.10%	0.15%	0.64%	0.78%	0.27%	0.15%	0.16%	0.22%	0.16%	0.20%
Latvia	0.94%	1.18%	2.01%	3.01%	1.28%	0.96%	1.03%	1.34%	1.75%	1.92%
Liechtenstein	0.58%	0.16%	0.32%	0.00%	0.44%	0.96%	0.21%	0.60%	0.82%	0.68%
Lithuania	0.75%	0.90%	2.20%	5.83%	1.44%	1.18%	1.32%	1.44%	1.99%	2.20%
Luxembourg	0.35%	0.32%	0.66%	0.72%	0.50%	0.38%	0.35%	0.51%	0.78%	0.57%
Malta	0.56%	0.68%	1.07%	1.40%	0.59%	0.48%	0.35%	0.59%	1.01%	0.85%
Monaco	0.43%	0.41%	0.93%	0.00%	0.45%	0.32%	0.40%	0.19%	0.55%	0.44%
Netherlands	0.48%	0.41%	0.62%	1.42%	0.51%	0.34%	0.40%	0.53%	0.64%	1.15%
New Zealand	0.32%	0.34%	1.42%	2.39%	0.53%	0.36%	0.32%	0.52%	0.58%	0.49%
Norway	0.30%	0.26%	0.51%	2.22%	0.39%	0.25%	0.23%	0.31%	0.41%	0.46%
Poland	0.53%	0.65%	1.55%	3.54%	0.95%	—N/a	—N/a	—N/a	—N/a	—N/a
Portugal	1.88%	2.30%	4.75%	7.38%	2.19%	1.80%	1.80%	2.08%	2.42%	2.31%
San Marino	0.52%	0.28%	3.20%	0.00%	0.74%	0.14%	0.41%	0.42%	2.01%	2.28%
Singapore	0.30%	0.28%	0.75%	3.15%	0.28%	0.29%	0.22%	0.29%	0.49%	0.38%
Slovakia	0.58%	0.73%	1.29%	3.34%	1.17%	0.70%	0.93%	1.07%	1.85%	2.36%
Slovenia	0.41%	0.33%	0.75%	1.67%	0.59%	0.41%	0.39%	0.59%	1.03%	1.17%
South Korea	0.26%	0.30%	0.91%	1.65%	0.35%	0.27%	0.29%	0.37%	0.46%	0.76%
Spain	1.63%	2.38%	5.58%	6.65%	1.68%	1.31%	1.12%	1.38%	1.46%	1.40%
Sweden	0.31%	0.32%	0.56%	2.10%	0.43%	0.29%	0.26%	0.44%	0.53%	0.48%
Switzerland	0.33%	0.39%	0.64%	1.48%	0.51%	0.45%	0.30%	0.39%	0.59%	0.55%
Taiwan	0.55%	0.75%	3.56%	2.76%	0.60%	0.52%	0.41%	0.59%	0.57%	0.53%
United Kingdom	0.32%	0.41%	0.56%	1.70%	0.64%	0.33%	0.30%	0.54%	0.50%	0.43%
Total	0.49%	0.62%	1.32%	2.96%	0.64%	0.44%	0.41%	0.58%	0.68%	0.73%

== Other visa waivers ==
=== Nationals of neighboring jurisdictions ===
Separate from the Visa Waiver Program, 8 U.S.C. § 1182(d)(4)(B) permits the Attorney General and the Secretary of State (acting jointly) to waive visa requirements for admission to the United States in nonimmigrant status for nationals of foreign contiguous territories or adjacent islands or for residents of those territories or islands who have a common nationality with those nationals. The regulations relating to such admissions can be found at 8 CFR 212.1.

Under this provision, nationals of the following jurisdictions may travel to the United States without a visa:

- Bahamas – Nationals of the Bahamas do not need a visa to travel to the United States if they apply for admission at a U.S. preclearance facility located in the Bahamas. Applicants 14 years of age or older must present a certificate issued by the Royal Bahamas Police Force indicating no criminal record.
- Bermuda – British Overseas Territories citizens of Bermuda do not need a visa to visit the United States under most circumstances for up to 180 days.
- British Virgin Islands – British Overseas Territories citizens of the British Virgin Islands may travel without a visa to the U.S. Virgin Islands. They may also continue travel to other parts of the United States if they present a certificate issued by the Royal Virgin Islands Police Force indicating no criminal record.
- Canada – Canadian citizens do not need a visa to visit the United States under most circumstances. In addition, under the USMCA (and earlier NAFTA), they may obtain authorization to work under a simplified procedure.
- Cayman Islands – British Overseas Territories citizens of the Cayman Islands do not need a visa if they travel directly from the territory to the United States and present a certificate issued by the Royal Cayman Islands Police Service indicating no criminal record.
- Mexico – Some nationals of Mexico do not need a visa to travel to the United States: government officials not permanently assigned to the United States and their accompanying family members, holding diplomatic or official passports, for stays of up to six months; members of the Kickapoo tribes of Texas or Oklahoma, holding Form I-872, American Indian Card; and crew members of Mexican airlines operating in the United States. Other nationals of Mexico may travel to the United States with a Border Crossing Card, which functions as a visa and has similar requirements. Under the USMCA (and earlier NAFTA), they may also obtain authorization to work under a simplified procedure.
- Turks and Caicos Islands – British Overseas Territories citizens of the Turks and Caicos Islands do not need a visa if they travel directly from the territory to the United States and present a certificate issued by the Royal Turks and Caicos Islands Police Force indicating no criminal record.

Restrictions on the use of the Visa Waiver Program do not affect this class of travelers unless separately provided for by statute or regulation. For example, a Canadian citizen who has briefly overstayed a previous visit to the United States (by less than 180 days) will still not require a visa for future visits, while a VWP national who overstays will become ineligible for the VWP for life and will need a visa for future visits. ESTA is not required from British Overseas Territories citizens using one of the above waivers with the respective territory's passport, but it is required if they use the VWP with a British citizen passport.

Until 2003, this visa waiver was granted not only to nationals of those countries and territories, but also to permanent residents of Bermuda and Canada who were nationals of countries in the Commonwealth of Nations or Ireland.

=== Citizens of freely associated states ===
Under Compacts of Free Association, citizens of the following countries may enter, reside, study and work in the United States indefinitely without a visa. These benefits are granted to citizens from birth or independence, and to naturalized citizens who have resided in the respective country for at least five years, excluding those who acquired citizenship by investment.

- Marshall Islands
- Micronesia
- Palau

== See also ==
- Electronic System for Travel Authorization (ESTA)
- Visa policy of the United States
- US-VISIT
- Western Hemisphere Travel Initiative
