= Visa requirements for French citizens =

Administrative entry restrictions

A French passport

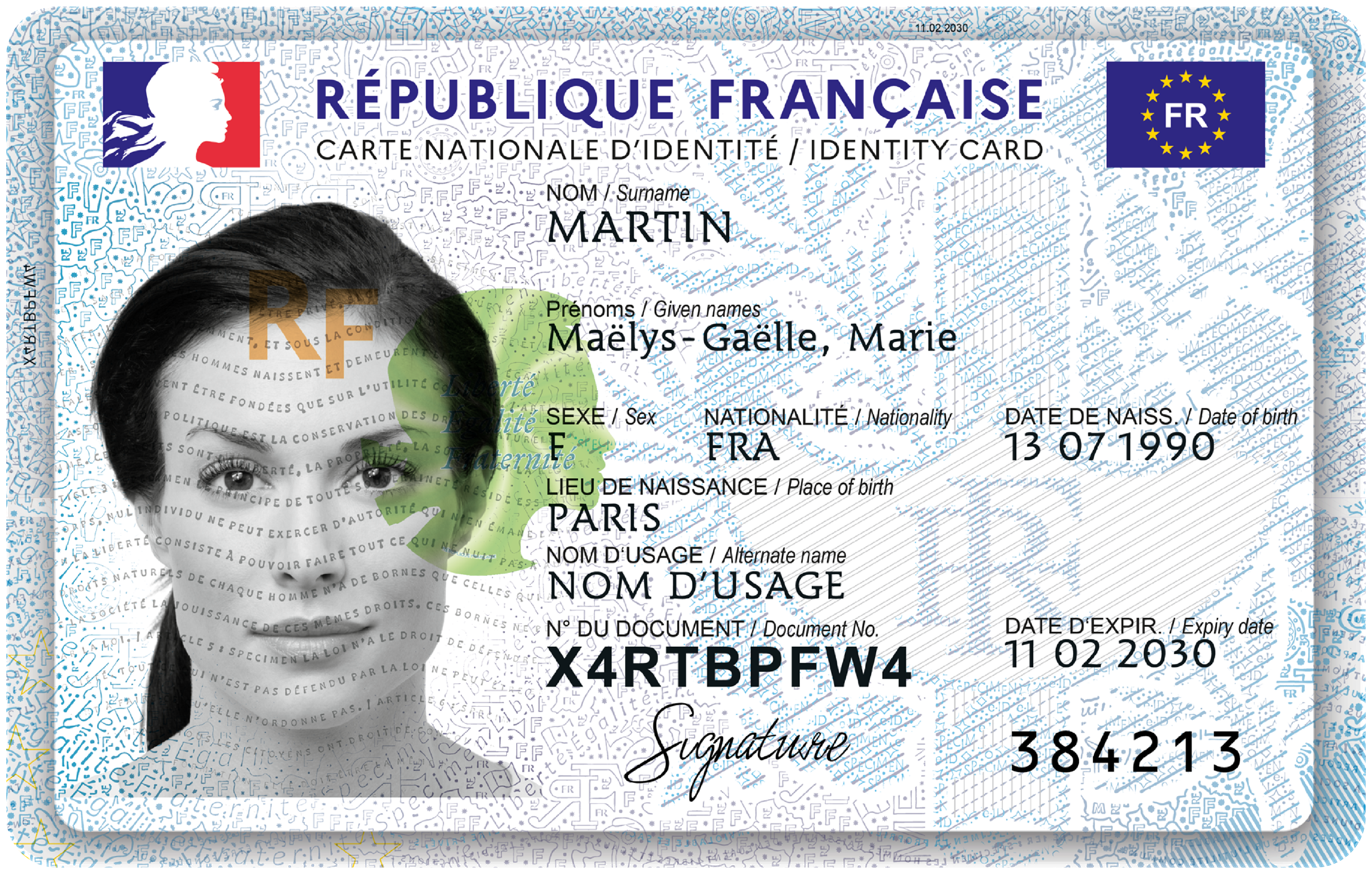
A French identity card is valid for travel to most European countries.

Visa requirements for French citizens are administrative entry restrictions by the authorities of other states placed on citizens of France.

As of 2026, French citizens have visa-free or visa on arrival access to 185 countries and territories, ranking the French passport 4th in terms of travel freedom according to the Henley Passport Index.

== Visa requirements map ==
Map of jurisdictions by visa requirement for French citizens holding ordinary passports France Freedom of movement Visa not required / ETA (Note: ETA required for Australia, Canada if arriving by air, Kenya, New Zealand, Saint Kitts and Nevis, South Korea, United Kingdom, United States and Israel) (Note: Including Australian eVisitor.) Visa on arrival eVisa Visa available both on arrival or online (Note: Including Indonesian e-VOA.) Visa required prior to arrival

Country colors need to be changed for Afghanistan, Turkmenistan and Ghana which have an evisa now

== Visa requirements ==
Country / Region	Visa requirement	Allowed stay	Notes (excluding departure fees)	Reciprocity
Afghanistan	eVisa		Visa is not required in case born in Afghanistan or can proof that one of their parents is a national of Afghanistan or born in Afghanistan.; e-Visa : Visitors must arrive at Kabul International (KBL).	✓
Albania	Visa not required	90 days	Passport-free entry with valid ID card	X
Algeria	Visa required		Visa Issuance for passengers with a boarding authorization traveling as tourists to cities in the south of Algeria (Timimoun, Ghardaia, Ilizi, Djanet or Tamanraset) can obtain a visa on arrival for a maximum of 30 days. They must have: a return/onward ticket, a hotel reservation confirmation.	✓
Andorra	Visa not required	90 days	Passport-free entry with valid ID card; Under bilateral agreement, there is a simplified procedure in place for obtaining residence and work permits.	✓
Angola	Visa not required	30 days	30 days per trip, but no more than 90 days within any 1 calendar year for tourism purposes only.; Visitors must have a return/onward ticket and a hotel reservation confirmation.; An International Certificate of Vaccination is required.	X
Antigua and Barbuda	Visa not required	180 days		✓
Argentina	Visa not required	90 days		✓
Armenia	Visa not required	180 days		X
Australia	eVisitor	90 days	eVisitor is considered to be a visa under Australia law.; 90 days on each visit in 12-month period if granted.	✓
Austria	Freedom of movement		Passport-free entry with valid ID card	✓
Azerbaijan	eVisa	30 days		X
Bahamas	Visa not required	90 days		✓
Bahrain	eVisa / Visa on arrival	14 days	Extendable for an additional 2 weeks.	X
Bangladesh	Visa on arrival	30 days		X
Barbados	Visa not required	90 days		✓
Belarus	Visa not required	30 days	Visa-free until 31 December 2026.	X
Belgium	Freedom of movement		Passport-free entry with valid ID card	✓
Belize	Visa not required	30 days		X
Benin	eVisa	90 days	Must have an international vaccination certificate.	X
Bhutan	eVisa		Must pay 100 USD per person per day for Sustainable Development Fee	X
Bolivia	Visa not required	90 days		X
Bosnia and Herzegovina	Visa not required	90 days	90 days within any 6-month period.; Passport-free entry with valid ID card	X
Botswana	Visa not required	90 days	90 days within any year period.	X
Brazil	Visa not required	90 days	90 days within any 180 day period.	✓
Brunei	Visa not required	90 days		✓
Bulgaria	Freedom of movement	Unlimited stay	Passport-free entry with valid ID card	✓
Burkina Faso	eVisa	30 days		X
Burundi	Online visa / Visa on arrival	30 days	From December 2021, passengers of all countries that required visa, can now obtain visa on arrival at Bujumbura International Airport, and all land borders.	X
Cambodia	eVisa / Visa on arrival	30 days		X
Cameroon	eVisa			X
Canada	eTA / Visa not required	180 days	eTA required if arriving by air.	✓
Cape Verde	EASE	30 days	Must register online at least five days prior to arrival.	X
Central African Republic	Visa required			✓
Chad	eVisa	90 days	Must apply at least 7 days before arrival but maximum 90 days before arrival.	X
Chile	Visa not required	90 days		✓
China	Visa not required	30 days	Temporary visa-free from December 1, 2023 to December 31, 2026.; 240-hour (10-day) visa-free transit to a third country or region (including Hong Kong, Macau or Taiwan) using any mode of transport. Must have a confirmed onward ticket/itinerary, and enter through 1 of 64 approved ports.; During which, may freely travel within the 24 provinces permitted for visa-free transit and engage in tourism, business, and visits.; 24-hour visa-free transit to a third country or region (including Hong Kong, Macau, and Taiwan), is available at most international airports, without leaving the airport.; Travellers who need to leave the airport may obtain a temporary entry permit from immigration.; 5-day port visa (Visa on Arrival) for Shenzhen if arriving at designated ports of entry from Hong Kong by land or sea, for stays within Shenzhen.; 3-day port visa (Visa on Arrival) if arriving in Zhuhai or Xiamen at designated ports of entry, for stays within the respective city.; 15-day visa-free entry for cruise ship passengers in tour groups, if arriving at any cruise port along China's coastline, including but not limited to Tianjin; Dalian; Shanghai; Lianyungang; Wenzhou; Zhoushan; Xiamen; Qingdao; Guangzhou; Shenzhen; Beihai; Haikou; Sanya. May further travel inland to all regions of coastal provinces (and equivalents) and Beijing.; May apply for a port visa (Visa on Arrival) if travelling for an urgent, qualified reason. Prior clearance for port visa is highly recommended or may be denied boarding by airlines.	X
Colombia	Visa not required	90 days	90 days - extendable up to 180-days stay within a one-year period.	✓
Comoros	Visa on arrival	45 days		X
Republic of the Congo	Visa required		Visa not required if Passengers with a V.I.P invitation letter.	✓
Democratic Republic of the Congo	eVisa	7 days	e-Visa according to the Passport Index.	X
Costa Rica	Visa not required	90 days		X
Côte d'Ivoire	eVisa	3 months	e-Visa holders must arrive via Port Bouet Airport.	X
Croatia	Freedom of movement		Passport-free entry with valid ID card	✓
Cuba	eVisa	90 days	Can be extended up to 90 days.	X
Cyprus	Freedom of movement		Passport-free entry with valid ID card	✓
Czech Republic	Freedom of movement		Passport-free entry with valid ID card	✓
Denmark	Freedom of movement (in mainland Denmark)		Passport-free entry with valid ID card	✓
Djibouti	eVisa	90 days		X
Dominica	Visa not required	180 days	90 days within any 180 day period.; Passport-free entry with valid ID card(if coming from Guadeloupe ou Martinique, max 14 days).	X
Dominican Republic	Visa not required	30 days	Can be extended up to 120 days with fee	X
Ecuador	Visa not required	90 days		X
Egypt	eVisa / Visa on arrival	30 days	Passport-free entry with valid ID card and two passport type photos.	X
El Salvador	Visa not required	180 days		✓
Equatorial Guinea	eVisa		Must arrive via Malabo International Airport, processing fee 75 USD	X
Eritrea	Visa required			✓
Estonia	Freedom of movement		Passport-free entry with valid ID card	✓
Eswatini	Visa not required	30 days		X
Ethiopia	eVisa / Visa on arrival	90 days	Visa on arrival is obtainable only at Addis Ababa Bole International Airport.; e-Visa holders must arrive via Addis Ababa Bole International Airport.; e-Visa is available for 30 or 90 days.	X
Fiji	Visa not required	120 days		X
Finland	Freedom of movement		Passport-free entry with valid ID card	✓
Gabon	eVisa	90 days	e-Visa holders must arrive via Libreville International Airport.	X
Gambia	Visa not required	90 days		X
Georgia	Visa not required	1 year	Passport-free entry with valid ID card	✓
Germany	Freedom of movement		Passport-free entry with valid ID card	✓
Ghana	eVisa		Visa-free for transit	✓
Greece	Freedom of movement		Passport-free entry with valid ID card	✓
Grenada	Visa not required	90 days		✓
Guatemala	Visa not required	90 days		✓
Guinea	eVisa	90 days		X
Guinea-Bissau	Visa on arrival	90 days		X
Guyana	Visa not required	90 days		X
Haiti	Visa not required	90 days		X
Honduras	Visa not required	90 days		✓
Hungary	Freedom of movement		Passport-free entry with valid ID card	✓
Iceland	Freedom of movement		Passport-free entry with valid ID card	✓
India	eVisa	30 days	e-Visa holders must arrive via 32 designated airports (Note: Ahmedabad; Amritsar; Bagdogra; Bengaluru; Bhubaneswar; Chandigarh; Chennai; Coimbatore; Delhi; Gaya; Goa-Dabolim; Goa-Manohar; Guwahati; Hyderabad; Indore; Jaipur; Kannur; Kochi; Kolkata; Kozhikode; Lucknow; Madurai; Mangaluru; Mumbai; Nagpur; Port Blair; Pune; Surat; Thiruvananthapuram; Tiruchirappalli; Varanasi; Visakhapatnam) or 5 designated seaports. (Note: Chennai; Cochin; Mormugao (Goa); Mumbai; Mangalore); An Indian e-Tourist Visa may only be obtained twice within 1 calendar year.; Foreigners of Pakistani origin or who hold a Pakistani Passport are not eligible for an e-Visa. Foreigners who are not Pakistani nationals, but whose parents or grandparents (either paternal or maternal) were born in, or were permanent residents in Pakistan, are also not eligible for an e-Visa.; Former Indian citizens with an OCI (Overseas Citizen Of India) cards are eligible for unlimited travel and stay.	X
Indonesia	e-VOA / Visa on arrival	30 days	Cost for Visa on arrival approx. 30 Euro for 30 days. You can extend it once in Bali by another 30 days. As of February 2024.	X
Iran	eVisa	30 days	Passengers who have already made an application, at least two days before arrival, at the Iranian Ministry of Foreign Affair's e-Visa website and present the submission notification at the airport's visa desk may obtain a visa on arrival.	X
Iraq	eVisa	60 days	Authorities in Iraq have decided to remove the visa-on-arrival requirement for nationals of the European Union and several other countries, requiring them to now apply for an e-visa to enter Iraq through the official platform.; Visa on arrival or eVisa for up to 30 days for travel to Iraqi Kurdistan.	X
Ireland	Freedom of movement		Passport-free entry with valid ID card	✓
Israel	ETA-IL	90 days	Starting July 1, 2024, the ETA-IL (Electronic Travel Authorisation) will open for application submissions.	✓
Italy	Freedom of movement		Passport-free entry with valid ID card	✓
Jamaica	Visa not required	30 days		X
Japan	Visa not required	90 days		✓
Jordan	eVisa / Visa on arrival	30 days	Visa can be obtained upon arrival, it will cost a total of 40 JOD, obtainable at most international ports of entry and land border crossings (except King Hussein/Allenby Bridge)	X
Kazakhstan	Visa not required	30 days		X
Kenya	Electronic Travel Authorisation	90 days	Applications can be submitted up to 90 days prior to travel and must be submitted at least 3 days in advance.; eTA fee is 32.50 USD.; Proof of reservation at the hotel where visitors plan to stay is required (if staying with friends, an invitation letter is also acceptable).; Yellow fever vaccination certificate is required if coming from endemic countries.; Can also be entered on an East Africa tourist visa issued by Rwanda or Uganda.	X
Kiribati	Visa not required	90 days	90 days within any calendar period	✓
Kosovo	Visa not required	90 days	Passport-free entry with valid ID card	✓
North Korea	Visa required			✓
South Korea	Electronic Travel Authorization	90 days	The validity period of a K-ETA is 3 years from the date of approval.; K-ETA exemption until the end of 2026.	✓
Kuwait	eVisa / Visa on arrival	90 days		X
Kyrgyzstan	Visa not required	60 days		X
Laos	eVisa / Visa on arrival	30 days	18 (Note: Savannakhet Airport; Lanetoui - Mengkang (China); Meuangmom - Wan Pong (Myanmar); Banvang - Ban Khok Phai (Thailand); Namngeun - Huay Kon (Thailand); Paksan - Bueng Kan (Thailand); Paktaphan - Pak Saeng (Thailand); Pangmon - Ban Huak (Thailand); Phoudou (Thailand); Dak ta ock - Nam Giang (Vietnam); La Lai (Vietnam); Namkan (Vietnam); Namphao - Cau Treo (Vietnam); Namsoy - Na Meo (Vietnam); Naphao - Cha Lo (Vietnam); Pahang - Long Sap (Vietnam); Panghok - Tây Trang (Vietnam); Phoukeua - Bo Y (Vietnam)) of the 33 border crossings are only open to regular visa holders.; e-Visa may be used to enter Laos through the Luang Prabang, Pakse and Vientiane international airports, 3 Thai-Lao Friendship Bridges (Note: Vientiane (Friendship Bridge 1); Savannakhet (Friendship Bridge 2); Bokeo (Friendship Bridge 4)), in Boten (road and railroad), and in Vientiane (at Khamsavath railway station).; Visa on arrival is available at the Luang Prabang, Pakse and Vientiane international airports, 4 Thai-Lao Friendship Bridges (Note: Vientiane (Friendship Bridge 1); Savannakhet (Friendship Bridge 2); Khammouane (Friendship Bridge 3); Bokeo (Friendship Bridge 4)) and 7 border crossings. (Note: Nongnokkheane - Trapeang Kriel (Cambodia); Boten - Bo han (China); Golden Triangle/Samliemkham (Thailand); Khamsavath railway station (Thailand); Namheuang - Ban Na Kraseng (Thailand); Vang tao - Chongmek (Thailand); Dansavan - Lao Bảo (Vietnam))	X
Latvia	Freedom of movement		Passport-free entry with valid ID card	✓
Lebanon	Free visa on arrival	30 days	Extendable for 2 additional months.; Granted free of charge at Beirut International Airport or any other port of entry if there is no Israeli visa or seal, holding a telephone number, an address in Lebanon, and a non refundable return or circle trip ticket.	X
Lesotho	Visa not required	14 days	44 days eVisa also available	X
Liberia	Visa required			✓
Libya	eVisa			X
Liechtenstein	Freedom of movement		Passport-free entry with valid ID card	✓
Lithuania	Freedom of movement		Passport-free entry with valid ID card	✓
Luxembourg	Freedom of movement		Passport-free entry with valid ID card	✓
Madagascar	eVisa / Visa on arrival	60 days		X
Malawi	eVisa / Visa on arrival	30 days		X
Malaysia	Visa not required	90 days	The electronic Malaysia Digital Arrival Card must be submitted within three days before the date of arrival in Malaysia.	✓
Maldives	Free visa on arrival	30 days		X
Mali	Visa required			✓
Malta	Freedom of movement		Passport-free entry with valid ID card	✓
Marshall Islands	Visa not required	90 days	90 days within any 180 day period	✓
Mauritania	eVisa	30 days	As of Jan 5th 2025, all visa required nationals will be required to apply for an e-Visa before boarding their flight to Mauritania.	X
Mauritius	Visa not required	180 days	180 days per calendar year for tourism, 120 days per calendar year for business; ID card valid until 30.06.2026 only for Reunion residents.	✓
Mexico	Visa not required	180 days		✓
Micronesia	Visa not required	90 days	90 days within any 180 day period	✓
Moldova	Visa not required	90 days	90 days within any 180 day period; Passport-free entry with valid ID card	X
Monaco	Visa not required	3 months	Passport-free entry with valid ID card	✓
Mongolia	Visa not required	30 days	The Ministry of Foreign Affairs of Mongolia has exempted visas for 34 countries from January 2023 to December 2026.	X
Montenegro	Visa not required	90 days	Passport-free entry with valid ID card (30 days maximum).	X
Morocco	Visa not required	90 days		X
Mozambique	Visa not required	30 days	Travelers must register on the e-Visa platform at least 48 hours prior to travel and pay a processing fee of 650 MT.	X
Myanmar	eVisa	28 days	e-Visa holders must arrive via Yangon, Nay Pyi Taw or Mandalay airports or via land border crossings with Thailand — Tachileik, Myawaddy and Kawthaung or India — Rih Khaw Dar and Tamu.; e-Visa available for both tourism (allowed stay is 28 days) or business (allowed stay is 70 days) purposes.	X
Namibia	eVisa / Visa on arrival	90 days	Can be obtained online or on arrival for a fee of N$1,600 (approximately €82 / US$88).	X
Nauru	Visa required		visas issued under a simplified procedure	✓
Nepal	Online Visa / Visa on arrival	90 days		X
Netherlands	Freedom of movement (European Netherlands)		Passport-free entry with valid ID card	✓
New Zealand	NZeTA	90 days	May enter using eGate.; International Visitor Conservation and Tourism Levy must be paid upon requesting an Electronic Travel Authority.; Holders of an Australian Permanent Resident Visa or Resident Return Visa may be granted a New Zealand Resident Visa on arrival permitting indefinite stay (pursuant to the Trans-Tasman Travel Arrangement), subject to meeting character requirements and obtaining an Electronic Travel Authority prior to departure. Such travellers are not required to pay the International Visitor Conservation and Tourism Levy.	✓
Nicaragua	Visa not required	90 days		✓
Niger	Visa required			✓
Nigeria	eVisa	90 days	Holders of written e-Visa approval issued by the Immigration Authority can obtain a visa on arrival, provided they hold a visa application form and e-Visa application payment receipt and have an invitation letter from a Nigerian company accepting immigration responsibilities.	X
North Macedonia	Visa not required	90 days	Passport-free entry with valid ID card	✓
Norway	Freedom of movement		Passport-free entry with valid ID card	✓
Oman	Visa not required / eVisa	14 days / 30 days		X
Pakistan	eVisa	90 days	Free of charge	X
Palau	Visa not required	90 days	90 days within any 180 day period.	✓
Panama	Visa not required	90 days		✓
Papua New Guinea	Easy Visitor Permit	60 days	Available at Gurney Airport (Alotau), Mount Hagen Airport, Port Moresby Airport and Tokua Airport (Rabaul).	X
Paraguay	Visa not required	90 days		✓
Peru	Visa not required	90 days	90 days within any 6-month period.	✓
Philippines	Visa not required	30 days	A single or multiple entry eVisa for stays of up to 59 days is also available.	X
Poland	Freedom of movement		Passport-free entry with valid ID card	✓
Portugal	Freedom of movement		Passport-free entry with valid ID card	✓
Qatar	Visa not required	90 days		X
Romania	Freedom of movement		Passport-free entry with valid ID card	✓
Russia	eVisa	30 days		X
Rwanda	Visa not required	30 days		X
Saint Kitts and Nevis	ETA	90 days	All travelers must apply for an ETA online.	✓
Saint Lucia	Visa not required	90 days	90 days within any 180 day period.; Passport-free entry with valid ID card	✓
Saint Vincent and the Grenadines	Visa not required	90 days	90 days within any 180 day period.	✓
Samoa	Visa not required	90 days	90 days within any 180 day period.	✓
San Marino	Visa not required	3 months	Passport-free entry with valid ID card	✓
São Tomé and Príncipe	Visa not required	15 days		X
Saudi Arabia	eVisa / Visa on arrival	90 days		X
Senegal	Visa not required	90 days		X
Serbia	Visa not required	90 days	90 days within any 6-month period.; Passport-free entry with valid ID card	✓
Seychelles	Electronic Border System	90 days		✓
Sierra Leone	eVisa / Visa on arrival	3 months / 30 days		X
Singapore	Visa not required	90 days		✓
Slovakia	Freedom of movement	Unlimited stay	Passport-free entry with valid ID card	
Slovenia	Freedom of movement		Passport-free entry with valid ID card	✓
Solomon Islands	Visa not required	90 days	90 days within any 180 day period.	✓
Somalia	eVisa	30 days	All visitors must have an approved Electronic Visa (eTAS) before the start of their journey	No
South Africa	Visa not required	90 days		X
South Sudan	eVisa		Obtainable online.; Printed visa authorization must be presented at the time of travel.	X
Spain	Freedom of movement		Passport-free entry with valid ID card	✓
Sri Lanka	Visa not required	30 days	Sri Lanka introduced an ETA valid for 30 days.	X
Sudan	Visa required			✓
Suriname	Visa not required	90 days	An entrance fee of USD 50 or EUR 50 must be paid online prior to arrival.; Multiple entry e-Visa is also available.	X
Sweden	Freedom of movement		Passport-free entry with valid ID card	✓
Switzerland	Freedom of movement		Passport-free entry with valid ID card	✓
Syria	eVisa			X
Tajikistan	Visa not required	30 days	60 days eVisa also available.; e-Visa holders can enter through all border points.	X
Tanzania	eVisa / Visa on arrival	90 days		X
Thailand	Visa not required	60 days		X
Timor-Leste	Visa not required	90 days	90 days within any 180 day period.	✓
Togo	eVisa	15 days		X
Tonga	Visa not required	90 days	90 days within any 180 day period.	✓
Trinidad and Tobago	Visa not required	90 days	90 days within any 180 day period.	X
Tunisia	Visa not required	90 days		X
Turkey	Visa not required	90 days	Passport-free entry with valid ID card; Former Turkish citizens with a Turkish "Blue Card" (Mavi Kart): Freedom of movement.	X
Turkmenistan	eVisa		✓	
Tuvalu	Visa not required	90 days	90 days within any 180 day period.	✓
Uganda	eVisa	3 months		X
Ukraine	Visa not required	90 days	90 days within any 180 day period.	✓
United Arab Emirates	Visa not required	90 days	90 days within any 180 day period.	✓
United Kingdom	ETA UK	6 months	ETA UK (valid for 2 years when issued) required from 2 April 2025.; Adults can use ePassport gates.	✓
United States	Visa Waiver Program	90 days	ESTA is valid for 2 years from the date of issuance.; ESTA is also required when entering the country by cruise ship or land.; A Form I-94 is required for entry into the United States by land. It carries a $30 fee and can be obtained either online or upon arrival.; Visa required for nationals of VWP countries who have travelled or been present in Iran, Iraq, Libya, North Korea, Somalia, Sudan, Syria or Yemen at any time on or after 1 March 2011 or Cuba at any time on or after 12 January 2021, or nationals of VWP countries who are also nationals of Iran, Iraq, North Korea, Sudan or Syria. Exceptions apply if the travel was in military or diplomatic service of the VWP country.	✓
Uruguay	Visa not required	90 days		✓
Uzbekistan	Visa not required	30 days		X
Vanuatu	Visa not required	90 days	90 days within any 180 day period.	X
Vatican City	Visa not required	1 day	Residence Forbidden; Passport-free entry with valid ID card	✓
Venezuela	Visa not required	90 days		✓
Vietnam	Visa not required	45 days	A single entry e-Visa valid for 90 days is also available.	X
Yemen	Visa required			✓
Zambia	Visa not required	90 days	Also eligible for a universal visa.	X
Zimbabwe	eVisa / Visa on arrival	30 days	Also eligible for a universal visa.	X

=== List of territories, disputed areas or restricted zones ===
Visa requirements for French citizens for visits to various territories, disputed areas, partially recognized countries and restricted zones:

Visitor to	Visa requirement	Allowed stay	Notes (excluding departure fees)
Europe
Abkhazia	Visa required		
Mount Athos	Special permit required	4 days	Special permit required (25 euro for Orthodox visitors, 35 euro for non-Orthodox visitors, 18 euro for students). There is a visitors' quota: maximum 100 Orthodox and 10 non-Orthodox per day and women are not allowed.
(Belarus) Brest and Grodno	Visa not required	Visa-free for 10 days	
Northern Cyprus	Visa not required	3 months	ID card valid
(United Nations) UN Buffer Zone in Cyprus	Access Permit required		Access Permit is required for travelling inside the zone, except Civil Use Areas.
Faroe Islands	Visa not required	90 days	ID card valid.
Gibraltar	Visa not required	6 months from January 2021.	ID card valid
Guernsey	Visa not required	6 months from January 2021.	ID card valid for a day trip.
Isle of Man	Visa not required	6 months from January 2021	
(Norway) Jan Mayen	Permit required		Permit issued by the local police required for staying for less than 24 hours and permit issued by the Norwegian police for staying for more than 24 hours.
Jersey	Visa not required	6 months from January 2021	ID card valid for a day trip
Kosovo	Visa not required	90 days	ID card valid
Russia	Special authorization required		Several closed cities and regions in Russia require special authorization.
South Ossetia	Russian multiple entry visa required		Multiple entry visa to Russia and three-day prior notification are required to enter South Ossetia.
Transnistria	Visa not required	24 hours	Registration required after 24h.
Africa
British Indian Ocean Territory	Special permit required		Special permit required.
(Spain) Canary Islands	Freedom of movement	Unlimited stay	ID card valid.
Eritrea outside Asmara	Travel permit required		To travel in the rest of the country, a Travel Permit for Foreigners is required (20 Eritrean nakfa).
(Portugal) Madeira	Freedom of movement	Unlimited stay	ID card valid.
Ascension Island	eVisa	3 months within any year period.	
Saint Helena	Visitor's Pass on arrival		Visitor's Pass granted on arrival valid for 4/10/21/60/90 days for 12/14/16/20/25 pound sterling.
Tristan da Cunha	Permission required		Permission to land required for 15/30 pounds sterling (yacht/ship passenger) for Tristan da Cunha Island or 20 pounds sterling for Gough Island, Inaccessible Island or Nightingale Islands.
Sahrawi Arab Democratic Republic	Visa not required	90 days	Same visa regime as Morocco.
Somaliland	Visa on arrival	30 days for 30 US dollars, payable on arrival.	
Sudan	Travel permit required		All foreigners traveling more than 25 kilometers outside of Khartoum must obtain a travel permit.
(Sudan) Darfur	Travel permit required		Separate travel permit is required.
Asia
(China) Hainan	Visa not required	30 days	Individual tourists need to select a tour agency and inform them their schedule.
Hong Kong	Visa not required	90 days	
India PAP/RAP	PAP/RAP required		Protected Area Permit (PAP) required for whole states of Nagaland and Sikkim and parts of states Manipur, Arunachal Pradesh, Uttaranchal, Jammu and Kashmir, Rajasthan, Himachal Pradesh. Restricted Area Permit (RAP) required for all of Andaman and Nicobar Islands and parts of Sikkim. Some of these requirements are occasionally lifted for a year.
Iraqi Kurdistan	eVisa	30 days	
Kazakhstan	Special permission required		Special permission required for the town of Baikonur and surrounding areas in Kyzylorda Oblast, and the town of Gvardeyskiy near Almaty.
(Iran) Kish Island	Visa not required		Visitors to Kish Island do not require a visa.
Macao	Visa not required	90 days	
(Malaysia) Sabah and Sarawak	Visa not required		These states have their own immigration authorities and passport is required to travel to them, however the same visa applies.
Maldives	Permission required		With the exception of the capital Malé, tourists are generally prohibited from visiting non-resort islands without the express permission of the Government of Maldives.
North Korea outside Pyongyang	Special permit required		People are not allowed to leave the capital city, tourists can only leave the capital with a governmental tourist guide (no independent moving)
Palestine	Visa not required		Arrival by sea to Gaza Strip not allowed.
Taiwan	Visa not required	90 days	
Tajikistan Gorno-Badakhshan Autonomous Province	OVIR permit required		OVIR permit required, can be obtained with e-visa application for an additional $20. Locally it may be obtained for 15+5 Tajikistani Somoni. Another special permit (free of charge) is required for Lake Sarez.
(China) Tibet Autonomous Region	TTP required		Tibet Travel Permit required (10 US Dollars).
Turkmenistan	Special permit required		A special permit, issued prior to arrival by Ministry of Foreign Affairs, is required if visiting the following places: Atamurat, Cheleken, Dashoguz, Serakhs and Serhetabat.
(United Nations) Korean Demilitarized Zone	Restricted zone		
(United Nations) UNDOF Zone and Ghajar	Restricted zone		Entrance to Ghajar is possible via Israel with the same Israeli visa policy as listed in the chart above.
(Vietnam) Phú Quốc	Visa not required	30 days	
Yemen	Special permission required		Special permission needed for travel outside Sanaa or Aden.
Caribbean and North Atlantic
(Portugal) Açores	Freedom of movement	Unlimited stay	ID card valid.
Anguilla	Visa not required	3 months	ID card valid (max 24 hours, 72 hours for St Martin residents)
Aruba	Visa not required	30 days, extendable to 180 days	
Bermuda	Visa not required	Up to 6 months, decided on arrival.	
(Netherlands) Bonaire, St. Eustatius and Saba	Visa not required	3 months	
British Virgin Islands	Visa not required	30 days, extensions possible	
Cayman Islands	Visa not required	6 months	
(Colombia) San Andrés and Leticia	Tourist Card on arrival		Visitors arriving at Gustavo Rojas Pinilla International Airport and Alfredo Vásquez Cobo International Airport must buy tourist cards on arrival.
Curacao	Visa not required	3 months	
Greenland	Visa not required	90 days	
(Venezuela) Margarita Island	Visa not required		All visitors are fingerprinted.
Montserrat	Visa not required	6 months	ID card valid
Puerto Rico	ESTA	90 days on arrival from overseas for 2 years	
Sint Maarten	Visa not required	3 months	
Turks and Caicos Islands	Visa not required	90 days	
U.S. Virgin Islands	ESTA	90 days on arrival from overseas for 2 years	
Oceania
American Samoa	Electronic authorization	30 days	
(Australia) Ashmore and Cartier Islands	Special authorisation required		Special authorisation required.
Cook Islands	Visa not required	31 days	
(Fiji) Lau Province	Special permission required		Special permission required.
Guam	ESTA	90 days on arrival from overseas for 2 years.	
Niue	Visa not required	30 days	
Northern Mariana Islands	ESTA		Visa not required under the Visa Waiver Program, for 90 days on arrival from overseas for 2 years. ESTA required.
Pitcairn Islands	Visa not required	14 days	Landing fee 35 USD or tax of 5 USD if not going ashore.
United States Minor Outlying Islands	Special permits required		Special permits required for Baker Island, Howland Island, Jarvis Island, Johnston Atoll, Kingman Reef, Midway Atoll, Palmyra Atoll and Wake Island.
South America
Galápagos	Online pre-registration required		Online pre-registration is required. Transit Control Card must also be obtained at the airport prior to departure.
South Atlantic and Antarctica
Falkland Islands	Visa not required	1 month	A visitor permit is normally issued as a stamp in the passport on arrival.
South Georgia and the South Sandwich Islands	Permit required		Pre-arrival permit from the Commissioner required (72 hours / 1 month for 110 / 160 pounds sterling).
British Antarctic Territory	Special permit required		
French Southern and Antarctic Lands	Special permits required		
Argentine Antarctica	Special permit required		
(Australia) Australian Antarctic Territory	Special permit required		
(New Zealand) Ross Dependency	Special permit required		
(Australia) Heard Island and McDonald Islands	Special permit required		
(Antártica Chilena Province) Chilean Antarctic Territory	Special permit required		
(Norway) Peter I Island	Special permit required		
(Norway) Queen Maud Land	Special permit required		

== Vaccination requirements ==
=== Vaccination requirements map ===
Certain countries and territories require travellers arriving from France to be vaccinated against specific diseases. This is a map of vaccination requirements for French citizens and residents arriving directly from the Schengen area, excluding those arriving from third countries.

Vaccination requirements for travellers arriving from France Quadrivalent meningococcal vaccination (ACYW135) required (Note: Saudi Arabia: in the Hajj and Umrah zones only) Polio vaccination required Yellow fever vaccination required Vaccination not required

=== Quadrivalent meningococcal vaccination (ACYW135) ===
Meningococcal vaccination requirements for international travel
Country or territory	Details
Gambia	All travellers must show proof of vaccination with quadrivalent meningococcal vaccine (ACYW135) upon arrival.
Indonesia	Travellers arriving from or departing to Saudi Arabia must show proof of vaccination with quadrivalent ACYW-135.
Lebanon	Proof of vaccination with quadrivalent ACYW-135 is required for travellers departing Lebanon and going to Hajj, Umrah, and to certain African countries.
Libya	All travellers must show proof of vaccination with quadrivalent ACYW-135 upon arrival.
Philippines	Proof of vaccination with quadrivalent ACYW-135 is required for travellers going to Hajj and Umrah (in Saudi Arabia).
Saudi Arabia	Proof of vaccination is required for travellers 2 years of age and older who are Hajj or Umrah pilgrims and seasonal or pilgrim workers in Hajj and Umrah areas. Vaccination with quadrivalent ACYW135 (either polysaccharide or conjugate) must be issued not less than 10 days before arrival and not more than 3 years (polysaccharide vaccine) or 5 years (conjugate vaccine) before arrival. The immunisation certificate should clearly state if the traveller was vaccinated with the conjugate vaccine for the 5-year validity to apply.; Vaccination is also required for domestic pilgrims, residents of Mecca and Medina, and any persons participating in Hajj or Umrah or seasonal or pilgrimage work in Hajj and Umrah zones. At the discretion of the Ministry of Health, travellers may be administered prophylactic antibiotics upon arrival.

=== Polio vaccination ===
Polio vaccination requirements for international travel
Country	Details
Afghanistan	Travellers from polio-endemic countries (Pakistan) need Carte Jaune proof of polio vaccination (received between 4 weeks and 12 months before departure) upon arrival. Residents and ALL travellers staying in Afghanistan longer than 4 weeks need proof of polio vaccination (received between 4 weeks and 12 months before departure) when departing from Afghanistan.
Belize	Travellers from Afghanistan and Pakistan need Carte Jaune proof of OPV or IPV vaccination (received between 4 weeks and 12 months before departure) upon arrival. Belize residents travelling countries with confirmed polio cases also need proof of vaccination.
Brunei	Travellers from polio-exporting countries need Carte Jaune proof of OPV or IPV vaccination (received between 4 weeks and 12 months before departure) upon arrival.
Egypt	Travellers from Afghanistan, Angola, Benin, Cameroon, the Central African Republic, China, Congo-Kinshasa, Ethiopia, Ghana, Indonesia, Kenya, Mozambique, Myanmar, Niger, Nigeria, Pakistan, Papua New Guinea, Philippines, and Somalia need Carte Jaune proof of OPV or IPV vaccination (received between 4 weeks and 12 months before departure) upon arrival.
Georgia	Travellers from at-risk countries need Carte Jaune proof of OPV or IPV vaccination (received between 4 weeks and 12 months before departure) upon arrival. Travellers without proof are offered OPV vaccination upon arrival.
India	Travellers from Afghanistan, Congo-Kinshasa, Ethiopia, Kenya, Nigeria, Pakistan, Somalia, and Syria need Carte Jaune proof of OPV or IPV vaccination (received between 4 weeks and 12 months before departure) upon arrival.
Iran	Travellers from Afghanistan, Pakistan, and Nigeria need Carte Jaune proof of OPV or IPV vaccination (received between 4 weeks and 12 months before departure) upon arrival. Travellers without proof will be vaccinated upon arrival.
Iraq	Travellers aged 15+ from Afghanistan and Pakistan need Carte Jaune proof of OPV or IPV vaccination (received between 4 weeks and 12 months before departure) upon arrival; children under age 15 must have received three doses of polio vaccine before travel. Travellers without proof will be vaccinated upon arrival. Travellers departing Iraq to Afghanistan and Pakistan must also provide proof of vaccination upon departure.
Jordan	Travellers from Afghanistan and Pakistan need Carte Jaune proof of OPV or IPV vaccination (received between 4 weeks and 12 months before departure) upon arrival.
Lebanon	Travellers from and to polio-affected countries need Carte Jaune proof of OPV or IPV vaccination (received between 4 weeks and 12 months before departure) upon arrival.
Libya	Travellers from Afghanistan and Pakistan need Carte Jaune proof of OPV or IPV vaccination (received between 4 weeks and 12 months before departure) upon arrival.
Maldives	Travellers from and to polio-exporting countries, as well as Hajj and Umrah pilgrims, need Carte Jaune proof of OPV or IPV vaccination (received between 4 weeks and 12 months before departure) upon arrival.
Morocco	Travellers from polio-affected countries need Carte Jaune proof of OPV or IPV vaccination (received between 4 weeks and 12 months before departure) upon arrival.
Nepal	Travellers from Afghanistan, Kenya, Nigeria, Pakistan, and Papua New Guinea need Carte Jaune proof of OPV or IPV vaccination (received between 4 weeks and 12 months before departure) upon arrival.
Oman	Travellers from polio-exporting countries need Carte Jaune proof of OPV or IPV vaccination (received between 4 weeks and 12 months before departure) upon arrival.
Pakistan	Travellers from ALL countries planning to stay in Pakistan for more than 4 weeks need Carte Jaune proof of OPV vaccination upon arrival. Residents and ALL travellers staying in Pakistan longer than 4 weeks need proof of OPV vaccination when departing from Pakistan.
Philippines	Travellers from or to high-risk countries need Carte Jaune proof of polio vaccination upon arrival or before departure, respectively. Due to an ongoing local VDPV2 outbreak, the government recommends all others travellers to consider getting a polio vaccine or booster dose, depending on their situation.
Qatar	Travellers from polio-exporting countries (identified by Qatar as: Afghanistan, Nigeria, Pakistan and Philippines) need Carte Jaune proof of OPV or IPV vaccination (received between 4 weeks and 12 months before departure) upon arrival.
Saint Kitts and Nevis	Travellers from polio-endemic countries as identified by WHO (Afghanistan and Pakistan) need Carte Jaune proof of OPV or IPV vaccination (received between 4 weeks and 12 months before departure) upon arrival.
Saudi Arabia	Travellers from active-transmission (including wild or vaccine-derived poliovirus) and at-risk countries, as well as all travellers from Afghanistan, Congo-Kinshasa, Mozambique, Myanmar, Niger, Nigeria, Pakistan, Papua New Guinea, Somalia, Syria, and Yemen, need Carte Jaune proof of OPV or IPV vaccination (received between 4 weeks and 12 months before departure) upon arrival. Regardless of immunisation status, all travellers from Afghanistan, Myanmar, Nigeria, Pakistan, Papua New Guinea, Somalia, Syria, and Yemen will be given an Oral Polio Vaccine dose upon arrival.
Seychelles	Travellers from countries with polio outbreaks need Carte Jaune proof of OPV or IPV vaccination (received between 4 weeks and 12 months before departure) upon arrival.
Syria	Travellers from Cameroon, Equatorial Guinea, and Pakistan need Carte Jaune proof of OPV or IPV vaccination (received between 4 weeks and 12 months before departure) upon arrival. ALL Syria residents departing Syria to any country also need proof of vaccination.
Ukraine	Long-term visitors departing to states with wild or circulating vaccine-derived poliovirus transmission should present Carte Jaune proof of vaccination with at least one dose of bivalent OPV or IPV (received between 4 weeks and 12 months before departure). Persons obliged to undertake urgent international travel must be immunised with a single dose of polio vaccine before their departure. There is also risk of poliovirus transmission inside Ukraine itself, and travellers to Ukraine are recommended to be up to date with their polio vaccination before entry.

=== Yellow fever vaccination ===
Yellow fever vaccination requirements for international travel (July 2019)
Country or territory	Status	Vaccination required for travellers coming from	Traveller age
Albania	No risk	Risk countries	1 year or older
Algeria	No risk	Risk countries (Note: Also required for travellers having transited more than 12 hours through a risk country's airport.)	1 year or older
Angola	Risk country	All countries	9 months or older
Antigua and Barbuda	No risk	Risk countries	1 year or older
Argentina	Risk provinces: Misiones, Corrientes	No (Note: The WHO has designated (parts of) Argentina, Brazil and Peru as risk countries, but these countries do not require incoming travellers to vaccinate against yellow fever.)	–
Aruba	No risk	Risk countries	9 months or older
Australia	No risk	Risk countries	1 year or older
Bahamas	No risk	Risk countries	1 year or older
Bahrain	No risk	Risk countries	9 months or older
Bangladesh	No risk	Risk countries (Note: Also required for travellers having transited any time through a risk country's airport.)	1 year or older
Barbados	No risk	Risk countries	1 year or older
Belize	No risk	Risk countries	1 year or older
Benin	Risk country	Risk countries	1 year or older
Bolivia	Risk country	Risk countries	1 year or older
Bonaire	No risk	Risk countries	9 months or older
Botswana	No risk	Risk countries	1 year or older
Brazil	Risk country	No	–
Brunei	No risk	Risk countries	9 months or older
Burkina Faso	Risk country	Risk countries	9 months or older
Burundi	Risk country	Risk countries	9 months or older
Cabo Verde	No risk	Risk countries	1 year or older
Cambodia	No risk	Risk countries	1 year or older
Cameroon	Risk country	All countries	9 months or older
Central African Republic	Risk country	All countries	9 months or older
Chad	Risk country	All countries	9 months or older
China	No risk	Risk countries	9 months or older
Christmas Island	No risk	Risk countries	1 year or older
Colombia	Risk country	Risk countries	1 year or older
Congo-Brazzaville	Risk country	All countries	9 months or older
Congo-Kinshasa	Risk country	All countries	9 months or older
Costa Rica	No risk	Risk countries	9 months or older
Côte d'Ivoire	Risk country	All countries	9 months or older
Cuba	No risk	Risk countries	9 months or older
Curaçao	No risk	Risk countries	9 months or older
Dominica	No risk	Risk countries	1 year or older
Dominican Republic	No risk	Risk countries	1 year or older
Ecuador	Risk country	Risk countries	1 year or older
Egypt	No risk	Risk countries	9 months or older
El Salvador	No risk	Risk countries	1 year or older
Equatorial Guinea	Risk country	Risk countries	9 months or older
Eritrea	No risk	Risk countries	9 months or older
Eswatini	No risk	Risk countries	9 months or older
Ethiopia	Risk country	Risk countries	9 months or older
Fiji	No risk	Risk countries	1 year or older
French Guiana	Risk country	All countries	1 year or older
French Polynesia	No risk	Risk countries	9 months or older
Gabon	Risk country	All countries	1 year or older
Gambia	Risk country	Risk countries	9 months or older
Ghana	Risk country	All countries	9 months or older
Grenada	No risk	Risk countries	1 year or older
Guadeloupe	No risk	Risk countries	1 year or older
Guatemala	No risk	Risk countries	1 year or older
Guinea	Risk country	Risk countries	9 months or older
Guinea-Bissau	Risk country	All countries	1 year or older
Guyana	Risk country	Risk countries	1 year or older
Haiti	No risk	Risk countries	1 year or older
Honduras	No risk	Risk countries	1 year or older
India	No risk	Risk countries	9 months or older
Indonesia	No risk	Risk countries	9 months or older
Iran	No risk	Risk countries	9 months or older
Iraq	No risk	Risk countries	9 months or older
Jamaica	No risk	Risk countries	1 year or older
Jordan	No risk	Risk countries	1 year or older
Kenya	Risk country	Risk countries	1 year or older
Kyrgyzstan	No risk	Risk countries	1 year or older
Laos	No risk	Risk countries	Unknown
Lesotho	No risk	Risk countries	6 months or older
Liberia	Risk country	Risk countries	9 months or older
Libya	No risk	Risk countries	1 year or older
Madagascar	No risk	Risk countries	9 months or older
Malawi	No risk	Risk countries	1 year or older
Malaysia	No risk	Risk countries	1 year or older
Maldives	No risk	Risk countries	9 months or older
Mali	Risk country	All countries	1 year or older
Malta	No risk	Risk countries	9 months or older
Martinique	No risk	Risk countries	1 year or older
Mauritania	Risk country	Risk countries	1 year or older
Mayotte	No risk	Risk countries	1 year or older
Montserrat	No risk	Risk countries	1 year or older
Mozambique	No risk	Risk countries	9 months or older
Myanmar	No risk	Risk countries	1 year or older
Namibia	No risk	Risk countries	9 months or older
Nepal	No risk	Risk countries	1 year or older
New Caledonia	No risk	Risk countries	1 year or older
Nicaragua	No risk	Risk countries	1 year or older
Niger	Risk country	All countries	1 year or older
Nigeria	Risk country	All countries	9 months or older
Niue	No risk	Risk countries	9 months or older
North Korea	No risk	Risk countries	1 year or older
Oman	No risk	Risk countries	9 months or older
Pakistan	No risk	Risk countries	1 year or older
Panama	Risk country	Risk countries	1 year or older
Papua New Guinea	No risk	Risk countries	1 year or older
Paraguay	Risk country	Risk countries	1 year or older
Peru	Risk country	No	–
Philippines	No risk	Risk countries	1 year or older
Pitcairn Islands	No risk	Risk countries	1 year or older
Rwanda	No risk	Risk countries	1 year or older
Saint Barthélemy	No risk	Risk countries	1 year or older
Saint Helena	No risk	Risk countries	1 year or older
Saint Kitts and Nevis	No risk	Risk countries	1 year or older
Saint Lucia	No risk	Risk countries	9 months or older
Saint Martin	No risk	Risk countries	1 year or older
Saint Vincent and the Grenadines	No risk	Risk countries	1 year or older
Samoa	No risk	Risk countries	1 year or older
São Tomé and Príncipe	No risk	Risk countries	1 year or older
Saudi Arabia	No risk	Risk countries	1 year or older
Senegal	Risk country	Risk countries	9 months or older
Seychelles	No risk	Risk countries	1 year or older
Sierra Leone	Risk country	All countries	Unknown
Singapore	No risk	Risk countries	1 year or older
Sint Eustatius	No risk	Risk countries	6 months or older
Sint Maarten	No risk	Risk countries	9 months or older
Solomon Islands	No risk	Risk countries	9 months or older
Somalia	No risk	Risk countries	9 months or older
South Africa	No risk	Risk countries	1 year or older
South Sudan	Risk country	All countries	9 months or older
Sri Lanka	No risk	Risk countries	9 months or older
Sudan	Risk country	Risk countries	1 year or older
Suriname	Risk country	Risk countries	1 year or older
Tanzania	No risk	Risk countries	1 year or older
Thailand	No risk	Risk countries	1 year or older
Togo	Risk country	All countries	9 months or older
Trinidad and Tobago	Risk region: Trinidad	Risk countries	1 year or older
Uganda	Risk country	All countries	1 year or older
United Arab Emirates	No risk	Risk countries	9 months or older
Venezuela	Risk country	Risk countries	1 year or older
Wallis and Futuna	No risk	Risk countries	1 year or older
Zambia	No risk	Risk countries	1 year or older
Zimbabwe	No risk	Risk countries	9 months or older

=== COVID-19 vaccination ===
Many countries increasingly consider the vaccination status of travellers with regard to quarantine requirements or when deciding to allow them entry at all. This is justified by research that shows that the Pfizer vaccine effect lasts for six months or so.

== Passport requirements ==
=== Passport not required ===
French identity card is valid for these countries :

- EU and Europe (except Belarus, Russia, the United Kingdom [for tourism] and Ukraine)
- Dominica (max. 14 days)
- Egypt
- Georgia
- Greenland (de facto)
- Montserrat
- Saint Lucia
- Tunisia (on organized tours)
- Turkey
- United Kingdom (individuals with pre-settled or settled status, a frontier-worker permit or those who are a Swiss service provider can continue using national identity cards to enter the UK until at least 31 December 2025)

=== Blank passport pages ===
Many countries require a minimum number of blank pages to be available in the passport being presented, typically one or two pages. Endorsement pages, which often appear after the visa pages, are not counted as being valid or available.

=== Passport validity length ===
Many countries require passports to be valid for at least 6 months upon arrival and one or two blank pages.

Countries requiring passports to be validity at least 6 months on arrival include Afghanistan, Algeria, Bangladesh, Bhutan, Botswana, Brunei, Cambodia, Comoros, Côte d'Ivoire, Ecuador, Egypt, El Salvador, Fiji, Guyana, Haiti, Indonesia, Iran, Iraq (except when arriving at Basra – 3 months and Erbil or Sulaimaniyah – on arrival), Jordan, Kenya, Kiribati, Kuwait, Laos, Madagascar, Malaysia, Marshall Islands, Mauritania, Mongolia, Myanmar, Namibia, Nicaragua, Nigeria, Oman, Palau, Papua New Guinea, Philippines, Rwanda, Samoa, Saudi Arabia, Singapore, Solomon Islands, Somalia, Sri Lanka, Sudan, Suriname, Syria, Taiwan, Tanzania, Timor-Leste, Tonga, Tuvalu, Uganda, United Arab Emirates, Vanuatu, Venezuela, Vietnam, Yemen.

Turkey usually requires passports to be valid for at least 5 months (150 days) upon entry, but for French citizens Turkish authorities allow to enter even with passport expired within last 5 years.

Countries requiring passport validity of at least 4 months on arrival include Azerbaijan, Micronesia, Zambia.

Countries requiring passport validity of at least 3 months on arrival include Albania, Bosnia and Herzegowina, Honduras, Moldova, Nauru, North Macedonia, Panama, Qatar and Senegal

Countries requiring passport validity of at least 1 month on arrival include Eritrea, Hong Kong, Lebanon, Macao, Maldives, New Zealand, South Africa.

Other countries require either a passport valid on arrival or passport valid throughout the period of intended stay.

=== Medical passport ===
Many African countries, including Benin, Burkina Faso, Burundi, Cameroon, Central African Republic, Democratic Republic of the Congo, Republic of the Congo, Côte d'Ivoire, Gabon, Guinea-Bissau, Kenya, Liberia, Niger, Rwanda, Sierra Leone and Togo, require all incoming passengers older than nine months to one year to have a current International Certificate of Vaccination or Prophylaxis, as does the South American territory of French Guiana.

== Entry bans ==
=== Criminal record ===
Some countries, including Australia, Canada, Fiji, New Zealand and the United States, routinely deny entry to non-citizens who have a criminal record, while others impose restrictions depending on the type of conviction and the length of the sentence.

=== Persona non grata ===
The government of a country can declare a diplomat persona non grata, banning them from entering the country or expelling them if they have already entered. In non-diplomatic use, the authorities of a country may also declare a foreigner persona non grata permanently or temporarily, usually because of unlawful activity.

=== Israeli stamps ===
Kuwait, Lebanon, Libya, and Yemen do not allow entry to people with passport stamps from Israel or whose passports have either a used or an unused Israeli visa, or where there is evidence of previous travel to Israel such as entry or exit stamps from neighbouring border posts in transit countries such as Jordan and Egypt.

To circumvent this Arab League boycott of Israel, the Israeli immigration services have now mostly ceased to stamp foreign nationals' passports on either entry to or exit from Israel (unless the entry is for some work-related purposes). Since 15 January 2013, Israel no longer stamps foreign passports at Ben Gurion Airport. Passports are still (as of 22 June 2017) stamped at Erez when passing into and out of Gaza.

Iran refuses admission to holders of passports containing an Israeli visa or stamp that is less than 12 months old.

== Biometrics ==
Several countries mandate that all travellers, or all foreign travellers, be fingerprinted on arrival and will refuse admission to or even arrest travellers who refuse to comply. In some countries, such as the United States, this may apply even to transit passengers who merely wish to change planes rather than go landside.

Fingerprinting countries/regions include Afghanistan, Argentina, Brunei, Cambodia, China, Ethiopia, Ghana, Guinea, India, Japan, Kenya (both fingerprints and a photo are taken), Malaysia upon entry and departure, Mongolia, Saudi Arabia, the Schengen Area, Singapore, South Korea, Taiwan, Thailand, Uganda, the United Arab Emirates and the United States.

Many countries also require a photo be taken of people entering the country. The United States, which does not fully implement exit control formalities at its land frontiers (although long mandated by its own legislation), intends to implement facial recognition for passengers departing from international airports to identify people who overstay their visa.

Together with fingerprint and face recognition, iris scanning is one of three biometric identification technologies internationally standardised since 2006 by the International Civil Aviation Organization (ICAO) for use in e-passports and the United Arab Emirates conducts iris scanning on visitors who need to apply for a visa. The United States Department of Homeland Security has announced plans to greatly increase the biometric data it collects at US borders. In 2018, Singapore began trials of iris scanning at three land and maritime immigration checkpoints.

== Right to consular protection in non-EU countries ==
Diplomatic missions of France

In a non-EU country where there is no French embassy, French citizens, like all other EU citizens, have the right to get consular protection from the embassy of any other EU country present in that country.

See also List of diplomatic missions of France.

== See also ==
- Visa policy of the Schengen Area
- French identity card
- France passport
