= All Indonesia Arrival Card =

Integrated digital arrival card system for international travellers to Indonesia

All Indonesia is an integrated digital arrival card system used for reporting the arrival of international travelers to Indonesia. It consolidates arrival-related declarations for immigration, customs, health, and quarantine into a single form that can be completed via a web portal or a mobile application, and is intended to speed up processing at airports and seaports.

== History ==
On 24 July 2025, the Government of Indonesia began a trial of All Indonesia at Soekarno–Hatta International Airport as an integrated declaration system intended to replace separate arrival reporting processes previously handled across different platforms by the Directorate General of Immigration, the Directorate General of Customs and Excise, the Ministry of Health, and the Indonesian Quarantine Agency. During the trial phase, the system was described as allowing travelers to complete the form up to three days before arrival, with each submission taking around 2.5 minutes, and the government stated that feedback would be used to refine the system ahead of full implementation.

A subsequent trial was reported to have begun on 1 September 2025, with implementation limited to selected international gateways, including Soekarno–Hatta (Jakarta), Juanda (Surabaya), and Ngurah Rai (Bali), as well as international seaports in Batam. Airlines also issued passenger guidance ahead of the 1 September start date, stating that completion of All Indonesia was mandatory and would replace other arrival declaration forms, including electronic customs declarations used at airports.

On 1 October 2025, Government of Indonesia announced the official launch of the All Indonesia application as the single integrated international arrival declaration system, and stated that, starting that date, travellers arriving from abroad were required to complete the declaration through the platform.

== Submission ==
All Indonesia can be accessed through a web-based platform at allindonesia.imigrasi.go.id or via the official All Indonesia mobile application available on major app stores. The arrival declaration may be completed up to three days before arrival in Indonesia or upon arrival at an airport or seaport, and submission generates a QR code used during arrival processing at airports and seaports.

The submitted information consists of four main sections: personal information; date of arrival and date of departure; type of transport and purpose of visit; and declarations.

The declaration section is divided into three parts. The health declaration requires travelers to indicate any symptoms and list countries visited within the previous 21 days. The quarantine declaration covers plants, fruit, vegetables, seeds, animals, or animal products brought into Indonesia, some of which may require a phytosanitary certificate. The customs declaration requires travelers to state the number of pieces of luggage and declare goods exceeding duty free limits, including alcohol, tobacco, medicines, and electronic devices such as mobile phones or laptops, which may be required for IMEI registration.

Reported features of the platform include online submission, the ability to save and reuse certain traveler details, multilingual support, notification functions, and encrypted data protection.

The system applies to both Indonesian citizens and foreign nationals and is used at international airports and seaports across Indonesia following its nationwide implementation.

== See also ==
- Visa policy of Indonesia
- Directorate General of Immigration
- Directorate General of Customs and Excise
- Indonesian Quarantine Agency
