= French passport =

Passport issued to French citizens

French passport; Passeport français
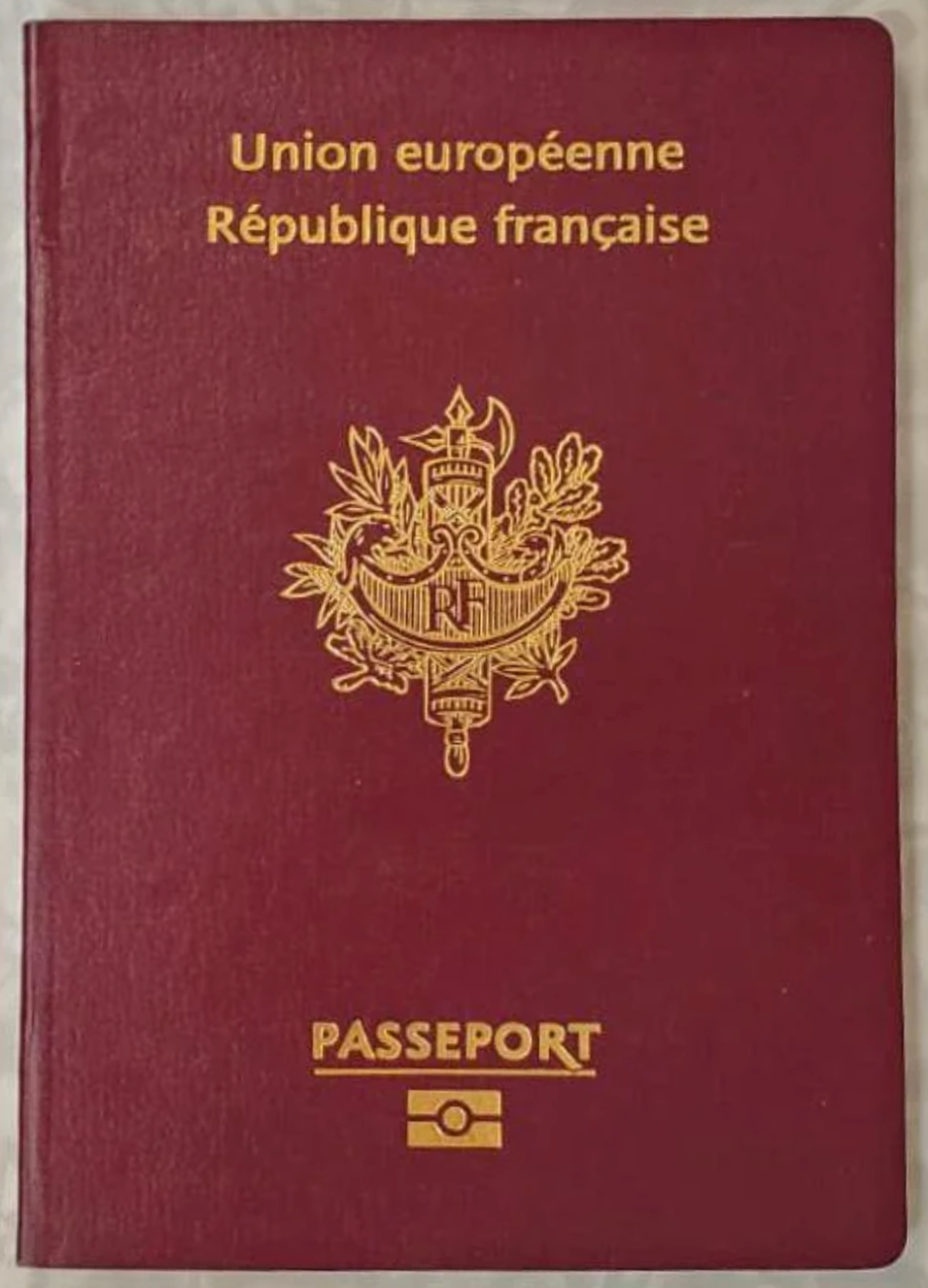
- Front cover of a French biometric passport
- Type: Passport
- Issued by: Ministry of Europe and Foreign Affairs
- First issued: 12 April 2006 (first biometric passport); 1 April 2013 (current version)
- Purpose: Identification
- Eligibility: French citizenship
- Expiration: 5 years after issuance for citizens under the age of 18; 10 years for adults
- Cost: ● Adult (18 or older) : Ordinary (32 pages): 86 € (France, except French Guiana); 43 € (French Guiana); 96 € (abroad); Great Traveler (48 pages); 86 € (France, except French Guiana); 43 € (French Guiana); 96 € (abroad); ● Between 15 and 17 years old : 42 € (France, except French Guiana); 21 € (French Guiana); 52 € (abroad); ● Child up to 14 : 17 € (France, except French Guiana); 8.5 € (French Guiana); 27 € (abroad); / 42 € (15-17) / 17 € (14 and under)

A French passport (French: passeport français) is an identity document issued to French citizens. Besides enabling the bearer to travel internationally and serving as indication of French nationality (but not proof; the possession of a French passport only establishes the presumption of French nationality according to French law), the passport facilitates the process of securing assistance from French consular officials abroad or other European Union member states in case a French consular is absent, if needed.

Every French citizen is also a citizen of the European Union. The passport, along with the national identity card allows for rights of free movement and residence in any of the states of the European Union, European Economic Area and Switzerland.

== History ==
The history of the French passport can be traced to documents issued in the 18th century. The French passport cover was changed in 2022.

== Types ==
Passports are valid for 10 years for applicants aged 18 or over and 5 years for applicants under the age of 18. Optical passports (older) have no sign under the word "Passeport" on the front page. Electronic passport contains an embedded chip and has the chip logo under the word "Passeport". Biometric passeports are the most recent ones and are decorated as the electronic passports but the word "Passeport" is underlined.

== Physical appearance ==
=== Front cover ===
Unlike those from most other EU countries which are burgundy, ordinary passports have a Bordeaux-red front cover, with the diplomatic emblem of France emblazoned in the centre of the front cover. The word "PASSEPORT" (Passport) is inscribed below the emblem and "Union européenne" (European Union), "République française" (French Republic) above. The "e-passport" cover has a microchip symbol at the bottom. On the biometric variant of e-passports, the word "PASSEPORT" is underlined. French passports use the standard EU design, with the standard passport containing 32 pages.

=== Identity information page ===
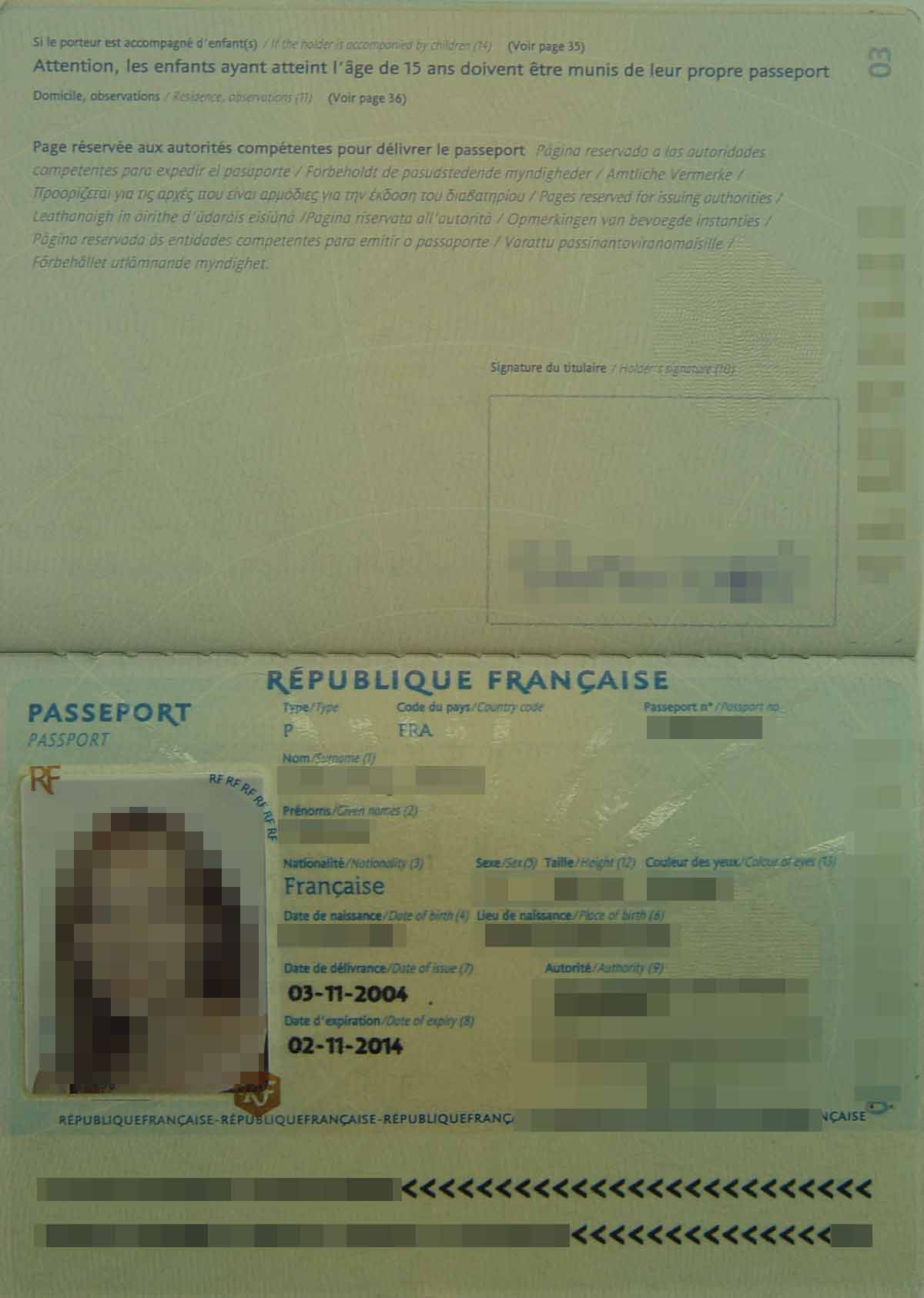
Biodata page of a French non-biometric passport

The biodata page includes the following data:

- Photo of Passport Holder
- Type (P)
- Code (FRA)
- Passport No.
- Surname
- Given Names
- Nationality (Française)
- Date of Birth
- Sex
- Place of Birth
- Date of Issue
- Date of Expiry
- Authority
- Holder's Signature
- Height
- Colour of Eyes
- Residence Page 36

The information page ends with the Machine Readable Zone starting with P<FRA.

=== Languages ===
The data page is printed in French and English with translation of the fields on the bearer's page in the other languages of the European Union elsewhere in the document.

== Visa requirements map ==
Visa requirements for French citizens France Freedom of movement and work Visa not required / ETA (Note: ETA required for Australia, Canada if arriving by air, Cape Verde, Kenya, New Zealand, South Korea and the United States.) (Note: Including Australian eVisitor.) Visa on arrival (Note: Including tourist card required in advance for Cuba.) eVisa (Note: Including visa on arrival with ETA for Pakistan.) Visa available both on arrival (Note: Including visa on arrival with ETA for Sri Lanka.) or online (Note: Including Indonesian e-VOA.) Visa required prior to arrival

Visa requirements for French citizens are administrative entry restrictions by the authorities of other states placed on citizens of France. As March 2025, French citizens had visa-free or visa on arrival access to 192 countries and territories, ranking the French passport 2nd in terms of travel freedom (tied with the passports of Germany, Finland, Italy, Japan and Spain), according to the Henley Passport Index.

French citizens can live and work in any country within the EU as a result of the right of free movement and residence granted in Article 21 of the EU Treaty.

== See also ==
- Passports of the European Union
- Visa policy of the Schengen Area
- Visa requirements for French citizens
