= Immigration Polytechnic =

University in Indonesia

- Politeknik Imigrasi
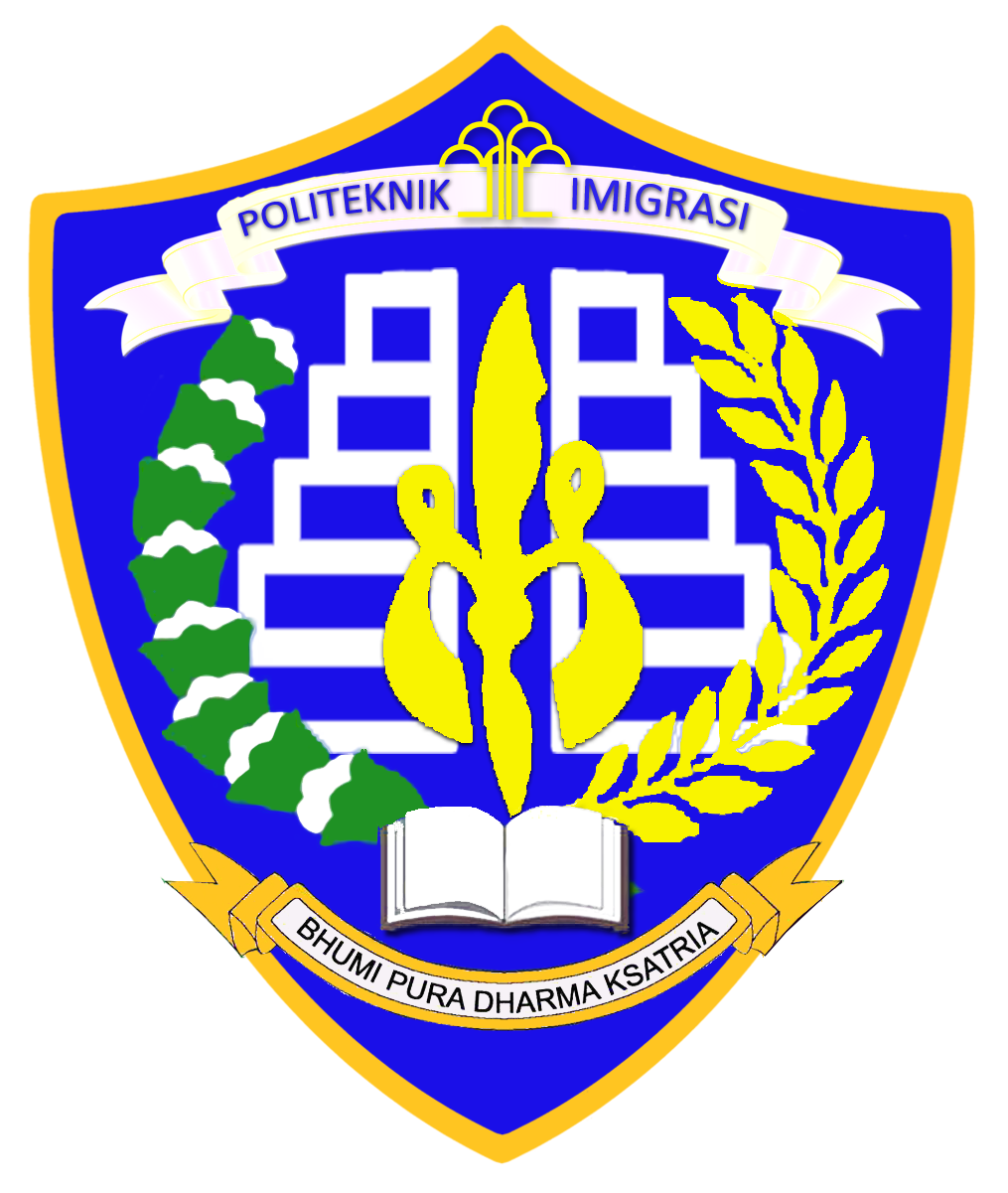
- Other name: Poltekim
- Motto: Bhumi Pura Dharma Ksatria
- Motto in English: Guardians of the Nation's Frontlines
- Established: 1962, re-founded 2000
- Parent institution: Ministry of Law and Human Rights
- Location: Cinere, West Java, Indonesia
- Website: https://poltekim.ac.id/

The Immigration Polytechnic (Indonesian: Politeknik Imigrasi, colloquially Poltekim) is an Indonesian government service academy under the aegis of the Ministry of Law and Human Rights. The Indonesian Polytechnic was founded in 1962, and it was re-established in 2000. Its mission is to train individuals to be employed as government employees in the field of immigration, whether they would like to be posted at immigration offices Indonesia-wide or at immigration units in Indonesian overseas missions.

== Programmes of study ==
The Polytechnic offers the following programmes of study:

- Diploma III Keimigrasian (Associate's Degree in Immigration)
- Diploma IV Hukum Keimigrasian (Bachelor's Degree in Immigration Law)
- Diploma IV Administrasi Keimigrasian (Bachelor's Degree in Immigration Administration)
- Diploma IV Manajemen Teknologi Keimigrasian (Bachelor's Degree in Immigration Technology Management)

== See also ==
- Directorate General of Immigration (Indonesia)
