= Visa policy of Indonesia =

Policy on permits required to enter Indonesia

Visitors to Indonesia must obtain an e-Visa unless they are citizens of one of the visa-exempt countries or citizens who may obtain a visa on arrival (e-VOA). Citizens who are ineligible to apply online must secure an Indonesian guarantor to apply on their behalf.

However, citizens of certain countries must obtain a Calling Visa before entering Indonesia, as the Indonesian government enforces these strict regulations primarily for national security, geopolitical considerations, and migration management.

All visitors must hold a passport valid for at least six months, as well as a valid return or onward ticket. Passports with validity of more than three months may be accepted in special cases or for business travel.

At the port of entry, immigration officers will ask passengers to present an arrival card and may ask for supporting documents such as hotel reservations and proof of sufficient funds.

== Visa policy map ==
Visa policy of Indonesia Indonesia Visa not required (30 days) Visa on arrival / e-VOA eVisa eVisa (issued only through a guarantor) eVisa (issued only with a government approval)

== Visa exemption ==
=== Ordinary passports ===
The Directorate General of Immigration publishes a list of countries whose citizens are visa-exempt.

Citizens of the following countries may enter Indonesia without a visa, for a maximum stay of 30 days with the biggest caveat being that one may not extend his/her stay at all past 30 days, and the following visitors get a 30 day e-VOA if they may need one extension:

- All ASEAN member states

- Belarus
- Brazil
- Colombia
- Hong Kong^{1}
- Kazakhstan
- Macau^{1}
- Peru
- Suriname
- Turkey

_{1 - For Chinese citizens with Hong Kong Special Administrative Region passports or Macao Special Administrative Region passports only.}

In addition, permanent residents of Singapore are eligible to enter Batam, Bintan and Karimun for a maximum stay of 4 days without a visa.

Citizens of a visa-exempt country may enter Indonesia through any of the designated border crossings, comprising 15 airports, 91 seaports and 12 cross-border land posts.

Date of visa changes

Citizens of following countries have never required a visa to enter Indonesia: Brunei, Chile, Ecuador, Hong Kong, Macau, Malaysia, Morocco, Peru, Philippines, Singapore, Thailand, Vietnam (Were cancelled in March 2022. However, Chile, Ecuador, Macau, and Morocco are not resumed)

- 16 March 2015: Austria, Bahrain, Belgium, Canada, China, Czech Republic, Denmark, Finland, France, Germany, Hungary, Italy, Japan, Mexico, Netherlands, New Zealand, Norway, Oman, Poland, Qatar, Russia, South Africa, South Korea, Spain, Sweden, Switzerland, United Arab Emirates, United Kingdom, United States
- 19 September 2015: Algeria, Angola, Argentina, Azerbaijan, Belarus, Bulgaria, Croatia, Cyprus, Dominica, Egypt, Estonia, Fiji, Ghana, Greece, Iceland, India, Ireland, Jordan, Kazakhstan, Kyrgyzstan, Latvia, Lebanon, Liechtenstein, Lithuania, Luxembourg, Maldives, Malta, Monaco, Panama, Papua New Guinea, Portugal, Romania, San Marino, Saudi Arabia, Seychelles, Slovakia, Slovenia, Suriname, Taiwan, Tanzania, Timor-Leste, Tunisia, Turkey, Vatican City, Venezuela
- 21 December 2015: Albania, Antigua and Barbuda, Armenia, Australia, Bahamas, Bangladesh, Barbados, Belize, Benin, Bhutan, Bolivia, Bosnia and Herzegovina, Botswana, Brazil, Burkina Faso, Burundi, Cape Verde, Chad, Comoros, Costa Rica, Côte d'Ivoire, Cuba, Dominican Republic, El Salvador, Gabon, Gambia, Georgia, Grenada, Guatemala, Guyana, Haiti, Honduras, Jamaica, Kenya, Kiribati, Lesotho, Madagascar, Malawi, Mali, Marshall Islands, Mauritania, Mauritius, Moldova, Mongolia, Mozambique, Namibia, Nauru, Nepal, Nicaragua, North Macedonia, Palau, Palestine, Paraguay, Rwanda, Samoa, São Tomé and Príncipe, Senegal, Serbia, Solomon Islands, Sri Lanka, St. Kitts and Nevis, St. Lucia, St. Vincent and Grenadines, Sudan, Tajikistan, Togo, Tonga, Trinidad & Tobago, Turkmenistan, Tuvalu, Uganda, Ukraine, Uruguay, Uzbekistan, Vanuatu, Zambia, Zimbabwe
- 15 September 2020: Colombia
- 6 April 2022: All ASEAN member states (resumed)
- 13 February 2023: Timor-Leste (resumed)
- 29 August 2024: Colombia (resumed), Hong Kong (resumed), Suriname (resumed)
- 3 July 2025: Brazil (resumed), Turkey (resumed)
- 12 August 2025: Peru (resumed)
- 9 July 2026: Belarus (resumed), Kazakhstan (resumed), Macau (resumed)

Cancelled:

- March 2022: All countries (All ASEAN member states were resumed on 6 April 2022; Timor Leste was resumed on 13 February 2023; Colombia, Hong Kong, and Suriname were resumed on 29 August 2024; Brazil, and Turkey were resumed on 3 July 2025; Peru was resumed on 12 August 2025; Belarus, Kazakhstan, and Macau were resumed on 9 July 2026)

=== Non-ordinary passports ===
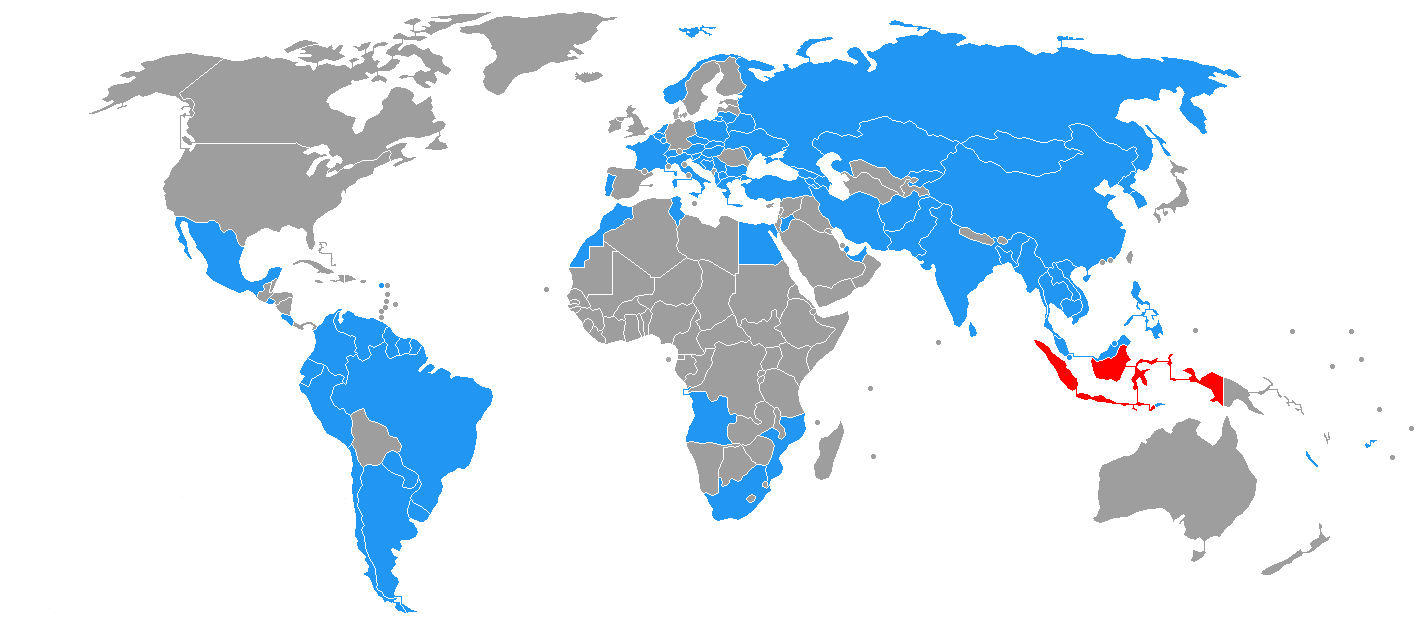
Indonesia Visa not required for diplomatic, official or service category passports

Holders of diplomatic or official / service category passports issued by the following countries may enter Indonesia without a visa for 30 days (unless otherwise noted):

- Afghanistan
- Albania
- Algeria
- Angola
- Antigua and Barbuda
- Argentina
- Armenia
- Austria
- Azerbaijan
- Bahrain
- Bangladesh
- Belarus
- Belgium
- Bosnia and Herzegovina
- Brazil
- Brunei^{1}
- Bulgaria
- Burundi
- Cambodia^{1}
- Chile
- China
- Colombia
- Costa Rica
- Croatia
- Cuba
- Czech Republic
- Denmark
- Ecuador
- Egypt
- El Salvador
- Equatorial Guinea
- Fiji
- Finland
- France
- Gambia
- Georgia
- Greece
- Guyana
- Hungary
- India
- Iran
- Ireland^{D}
- Italy
- Japan
- Jordan
- Kazakhstan
- Kuwait
- Kyrgyzstan
- Laos^{1}
- Lithuania
- Luxembourg
- Malaysia
- Mexico
- Moldova
- Mongolia
- Montenegro
- Morocco
- Mozambique
- Myanmar^{1}
- Netherlands
- Nepal
- Nicaragua
- Niger
- North Korea^{1}
- North Macedonia
- Norway
- Pakistan
- Panama
- Papua New Guinea
- Paraguay
- Peru
- Philippines
- Poland
- Portugal
- Qatar
- Romania
- Russia^{1}
- Rwanda
- Saint Kitts and Nevis
- Senegal
- Serbia
- Singapore
- Slovakia
- Slovenia
- Solomon Islands
- South Africa
- South Korea
- Sri Lanka
- Suriname
- Sweden
- Switzerland
- Tajikistan
- Tanzania
- Thailand
- Timor-Leste
- Tunisia
- Turkey
- Ukraine
- United Arab Emirates
- Uruguay
- Venezuela
- Vietnam^{1}

_{D - Diplomatic passports only.}
_{1 – 14 days}

=== APEC Business Travel Card ===
Holders of passports issued by the following countries who possess an APEC Business Travel Card (ABTC) containing the "IDN" code on the reverse, which indicates that it is valid for travel to Indonesia, may enter Indonesia without a visa for business purposes for up to 60 days.

ABTCs are issued to citizens of:

- Australia
- Brunei
- Chile
- China
- Hong Kong
- Japan
- South Korea
- Malaysia
- Mexico
- New Zealand
- Papua New Guinea
- Peru
- Philippines
- Russia
- Singapore
- Taiwan
- Thailand
- Vietnam

=== Future changes ===
Indonesia has signed visa exemption agreements with the following countries, but they have not yet been ratified:

Country	Passports	Agreement signed on
Burkina Faso	Diplomatic, service	25 September 2026
Somalia	Diplomatic, official	31 July 2025
Syria	Diplomatic, service	29 September 2024
Iraq	Diplomatic, service	23 September 2024
Eswatini	Diplomatic, official	2 September 2024
Ukraine	Ordinary	29 June 2022

== Visa on arrival ==
The Directorate General of Immigration also publishes a list of countries whose nationals are eligible to obtain a visa on arrival (VoA/e-VoA) to Indonesia, Despite its name, it can also be applied for online prior to arrival in Indonesia via its eVisa portal.

Citizens of the following countries may apply for a visa on arrival. This visa costs Rp500,000, and is valid for a maximum stay of 30 days. The visa can be extended once inside Indonesia for another 30 days at designated offices for an extra Rp500,000.

- All ASEAN member states^{N}
- All European Union member states

- Albania
- Andorra
- Argentina
- Armenia
- Australia
- Azerbaijan
- Bahrain
- Belarus^{N}
- Bosnia and Herzegovina
- Brazil^{N}
- Canada
- Chile
- China^{1}
- Colombia^{N}
- Ecuador
- Egypt
- Guatemala
- Hong Kong^{N} ^{1}
- Iceland
- India
- Japan
- Jordan
- Kazakhstan^{N}
- Kenya
- Kuwait
- Liechtenstein
- Maldives
- Mauritius
- Mexico
- Monaco
- Mongolia
- Morocco
- Mozambique
- New Zealand
- Norway
- Oman
- Palestine
- Papua New Guinea
- Peru^{N}
- Qatar
- Russia
- Rwanda
- Saudi Arabia
- Serbia
- Seychelles
- South Africa
- South Korea
- Suriname^{N}
- Switzerland
- Taiwan
- Tanzania
- Tunisia
- Turkey^{N}
- Ukraine
- United Arab Emirates
- United Kingdom
- United States
- Uzbekistan
- Vatican City
- Venezuela

_{N - Not required, but is still recommended in case one needs one extension.}
_{1 - For Chinese citizens with People's Republic of China passports or Hong Kong Special Administrative Region passports only.}

Citizens of a country eligible for a visa on arrival may obtain it at any of the designated border crossings, comprising 16 airports, 95 seaports and 11 cross-border land posts.

Date of e-VOA / Visa on arrival changes
- 7 March 2022: Australia, Brunei, Cambodia, Canada, France, Germany, Italy, Japan, Laos, Malaysia, Myanmar, Netherlands, New Zealand, Philippines, Qatar, Singapore, South Korea, Thailand, Turkey, United Arab Emirates, United Kingdom, United States, Vietnam
- 6 April 2022: Argentina, Belgium, Brazil, China, Denmark, Finland, Hungary, India, Mexico, Norway, Poland, Saudi Arabia, Seychelles, South Africa, Spain, Sweden, Switzerland, Taiwan, Timor-Leste, Tunisia
- 28 April 2022: Austria, Bulgaria, Croatia, Cyprus, Czechia, Estonia, Greece, Hong Kong, Ireland, Latvia, Lithuania, Luxembourg, Malta, Portugal, Romania, Slovakia, Slovenia
- 30 May 2022: Bahrain, Belarus, Bosnia and Herzegovina, Egypt, Jordan, Kuwait, Morocco, Oman, Peru, Russia, Serbia, Ukraine
- 27 July 2022: Colombia, Maldives, Monaco
- 15 September 2022: Albania, Andorra, Chile, Ecuador, Iceland, Liechtenstein, Palestine, Suriname, Uzbekistan, Vatican City
- 19 January 2023: Kazakhstan
- 28 February 2023: Kenya, Rwanda
- 19 April 2023: Guatemala
- 27 June 2023: Venezuela
- 21 August 2023: Armenia, Mozambique, Tanzania
- 1 September 2023: Papua New Guinea
- 9 January 2024: Mongolia
- 14 November 2024: Azerbaijan, Mauritius

Cancelled:

- 9 January 2024: Panama
- 14 November 2024: Macau, San Marino

== Electronic visa (e-Visa) ==
eVisa for Indonesia
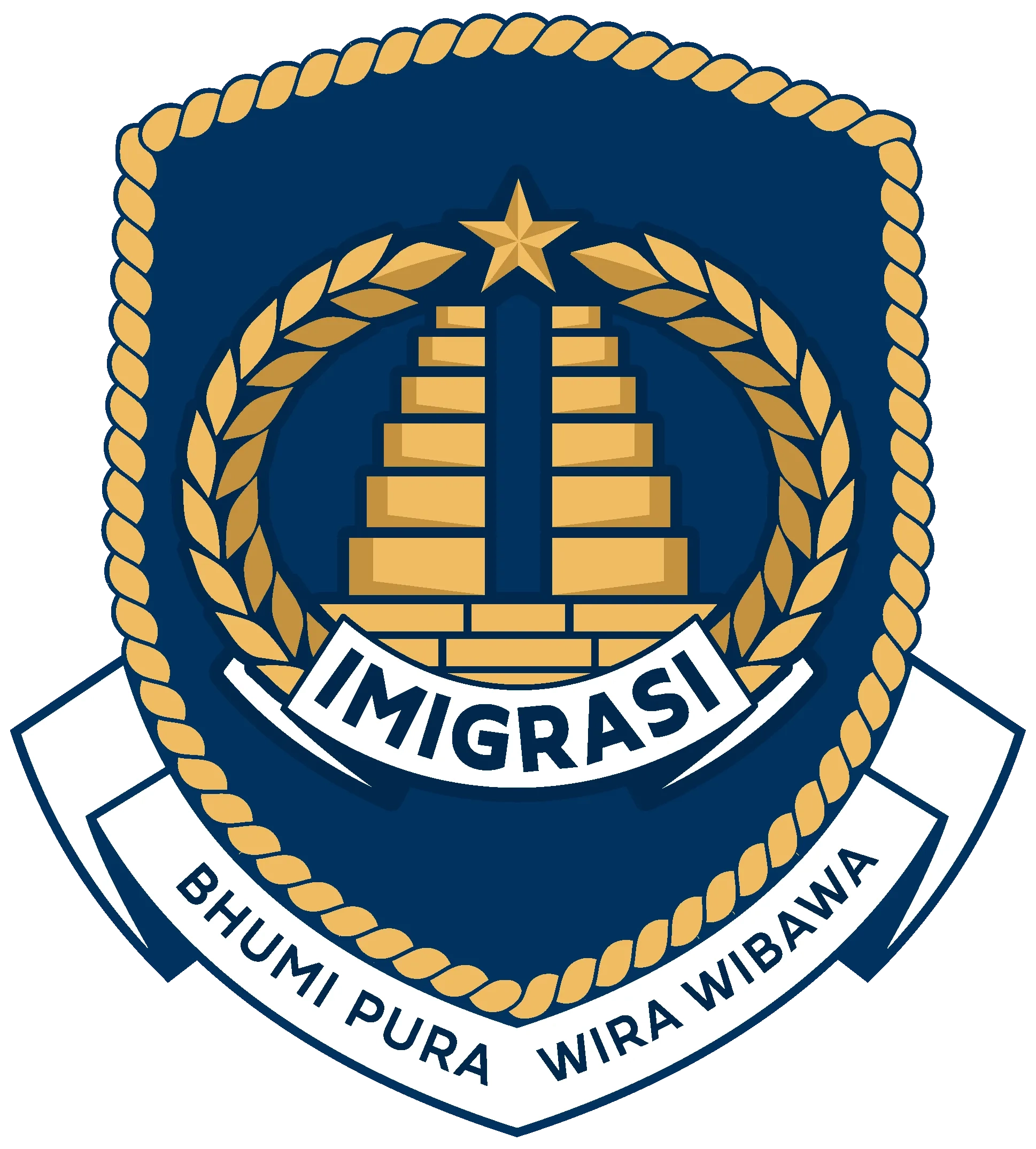

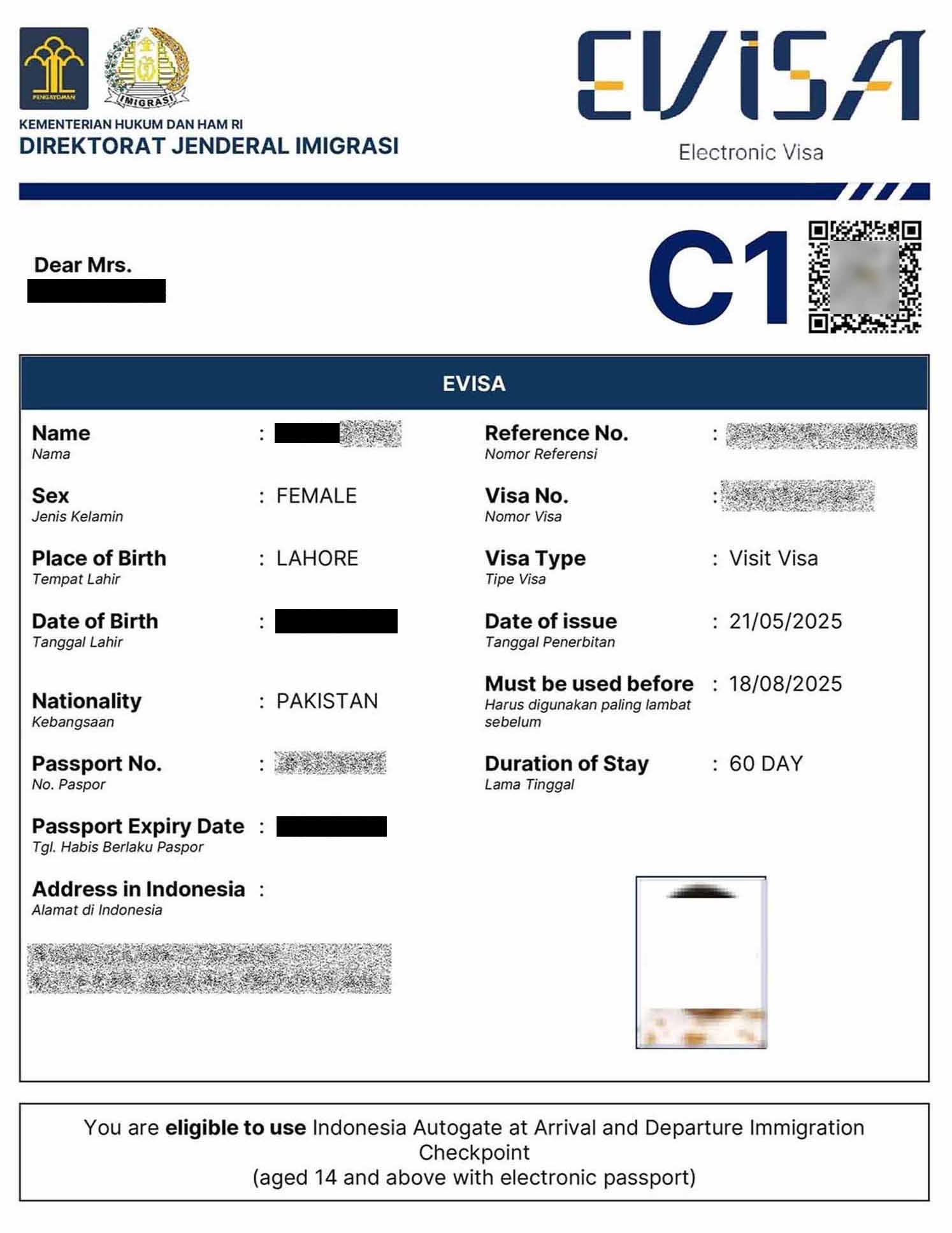
- Sample of Indonesian eVisa
- Owner: Directorate General of Immigration
- Website: evisa.imigrasi.go.id

Citizens of other countries that require a visa may obtain an e-Visa online.

=== Guarantor required ===
Citizens of the following countries are ineligible to apply independently and must secure an Indonesian guarantor to apply on their behalf.

- Bangladesh
- Cameroon
- Guinea
- Iran
- Yemen

=== Approval required (Calling visa) ===
The Calling Visa applies to citizens of countries considered to have certain vulnerabilities or risks related to ideology, politics, economy, society, culture, security, or immigration. Due to these factors, citizens of the following countries must obtain special approval from the Directorate General of Immigration in Jakarta before applying for a visa.

Besides a visa, they must hold a reference letter issued by the Directorate General of Immigration, as well as the invitation letter used to apply for their Indonesian visa, before traveling to Indonesia.

- Afghanistan
- Israel
- Liberia
- Nigeria
- North Korea
- Somalia

Date of calling visa changes

Cancelled:

- N/A: Iran, Iraq, Niger
- 8 August 2017: Pakistan
- 23 November 2023: Cameroon
- 2024: Guinea

== Transit without a visa ==
Passengers transiting through Soekarno-Hatta International Airport and not changing terminals, or those transiting through Ngurah Rai International Airport and not staying after 2 AM, do not need a transit visa if transiting for up to 8 hours.

== History of visa policy reforms ==
1. In March 2015, Indonesian authorities announced that from April 2015 visas would be waived for citizens of 30 other countries, namely Austria, Bahrain, Belgium, Canada, China, Czech Republic, Denmark, Finland, France, Germany, Hungary, Italy, Japan, Mexico, Netherlands, New Zealand, Norway, Oman, Poland, Russia, Qatar, South Africa, South Korea, Spain, Sweden, Switzerland, United Arab Emirates, United Kingdom and the United States. For a visa waiver to enter into force Indonesian law stipulating mandatory reciprocity must be changed. In October 2015, the list was further extended by a new presidential decree with another 45 countries.
2. Indonesian Government expects additional US$1.3 billion revenue for the foreign-exchange reserves as a result of the visa waiver.
3. In May 2015, Vice President Jusuf Kalla announced that the visa-waiver will be extended to 60-70 countries as soon as the reciprocity clause was removed from the immigration law.
4. On June 12, 2015, the Indonesian Government announced that it formally waived visa requirements for the 45 countries listed above for 30 days but the visit permit cannot be extended or changed to other permits.
5. On September 19, 2015, Indonesian authorities release the name of 45 additional countries and regions that will be eligible for visa free travel to Indonesia by the end of September 2015, namely Algeria, Angola, Argentina, Azerbaijan, Belarus, Bulgaria, Croatia, Cyprus, Dominica, Egypt, Estonia, Fiji, Ghana, Greece, Iceland, India, Ireland, Jordan, Kazakhstan, Kyrgyzstan, Latvia, Lebanon, Liechtenstein, Lithuania, Luxembourg, Maldives, Malta, Monaco, Panama, Papua New Guinea, Portugal, Romania, San Marino, Saudi Arabia, Seychelles, Slovakia, Slovenia, Suriname, Taiwan, Tanzania, Timor Leste, Tunisia, Turkey, Vatican City and Venezuela.
6. On December 21, 2015, Indonesian Maritime Coordinator Minister, Rizal Ramli announced that the visa-waiver policy would be extended to 84 additional countries by the end of 2015. The complete list is Albania, Antigua and Barbuda, Armenia, Australia, Bahamas, Bangladesh, Barbados, Belize, Benin, Bhutan, Bolivia, Bosnia and Herzegovina, Botswana, Brazil, Burkina Faso, Burundi, Cameroon, Cape Verde, Chad, Comoros, Costa Rica, Côte d'Ivoire, Cuba, Dominican Republic, El Salvador, Gabon, Gambia, Georgia, Grenada, Guatemala, Guinea, Guyana, Haiti, Honduras, Jamaica, Kenya, Kiribati, Lesotho, Madagascar, Malawi, Mali, Marshall Islands, Mauritania, Mauritius, Moldova, Mongolia, Montenegro, Mozambique, Namibia, Nauru, Nepal, Nicaragua, North Korea, North Macedonia, Pakistan, Palau, Palestine, Paraguay, Rwanda, Samoa, São Tomé and Príncipe, Senegal, Serbia, Solomon Island, Somalia, Sri Lanka, St Kitts and Nevis, St Lucia, St Vincent and Grenadines, Sudan, Tajikistan, Togo, Tonga, Trinidad & Tobago, Turkmenistan, Tuvalu, Uganda, Ukraine, Uruguay, Uzbekistan, Vanuatu, Zambia, Zimbabwe. 174 countries that can enjoy visa-waiver policy to Indonesia.
7. President Joko Widodo signed a Presidential Decree on 2 March 2016 with regards to the revision of list of countries that were granted short-term visit visa-free facility. Out of 84 additional countries that were initially planned to be added, only 78 were passed. Citizens of Cameroon, Guinea, Montenegro, North Korea, Pakistan, and Somalia would continue to require a visa prior to visit Indonesia.
8. On 5 August 2020, Indonesian Foreign Minister Retno Marsudi signed a visa exemption agreement with Colombian Foreign Minister Claudia Blum allowing ordinary passport holders from Colombia to enter Indonesia visa-free for up to 30 days. It went into effect on September 15, 2020.
9. The visa waiver system was suspended during the COVID-19 pandemic. Visa free entry was restored for only ASEAN and Timor Leste citizens in 2023. Citizens of 92 countries can obtain an e-VOA or a visa on arrival, essentially reverting to the pre-2015 system.
10. In December 2023, Minister for Tourism and Creative Economy Sandiaga Uno announced that the ministry is working to resume visa-free entry for nationals of 20 countries with "high spender" tourists, including Australia, China, France, Germany, India, Italy, Japan, the Netherlands, New Zealand, Qatar, Russia, Saudi Arabia, South Korea, Spain, Taiwan, United Arab Emirates, United States and United Kingdom.
11. The Jokowi administration signed the Presidential Regulation 95/2024 on 29 August 2024, which resumed visa-free access to tourists from Colombia, Hong Kong, and Suriname, as well as granting visa-free entry to Batam, Bintan and Karimun in the Riau Islands for Singapore permanent resident holders up to four days.
12. The Directorate General of Immigration announced on 2 July 2025 that it is resuming visa-free entry for tourists from Brazil and Turkey. The regulations are set to take into effect on the next day.

== Visitor statistics ==
Annual tourist arrivals (millions)

Source: Statistics Indonesia

Annual tourist arrivals by country of origin
Country of origin	8/2026	2025	2024	2023	2022	2021	2020	2019	2018	2017
Malaysia	1,886,713	2,639,749	2,278,281	1,901,242	1,212,574	480,723	980,118	2,980,753	2,503,344	1,238,276
Australia	1,224,941	1,754,791	1,671,222	1,431,177	655,370	3,196	256,291	1,386,803	1,301,478	1,188,449
China	1,054,007	1,344,074	1,198,582	787,924	169,378	54,713	239,768	2,072,079	2,139,161	1,972,405
Singapore	988,675	1,526,438	1,408,015	1,414,447	736,797	18,704	280,492	1,934,445	1,768,744	1,512,813
Timor-Leste	635,618	1,009,181	776,294	728,586	703,780	819,488	994,590	1,178,381	1,762,442	960,026
India	477,516	734,490	710,688	606,439	281,814	6,670	111,724	657,300	595,636	485,314
South Korea	316,935	496,862	436,054	347,185	122,226	9,497	75,562	388,316	358,885	378,769
United States	283,497	412,115	418,196	392,310	188,764	21,962	91,782	457,832	387,856	331,132
United Kingdom	274,693	412,902	392,133	335,209	170,881	5,177	69,997	397,624	392,112	361,197
France	249,312	367,904	346,337	273,682	134,541	3,776	43,438	283,814	287,917	268,989
Japan	226,181	380,079	338,934	251,866	73,913	5,952	92,228	519,623	530,573	538,334
Germany	178,866	287,596	281,397	263,534	128,634	3,429	46,361	277,653	274,166	260,586
Philippines	163,963	246,728	239,714	209,458	78,436	9,375	50,413	260,980	217,874	162,726
Netherlands	161,490	251,941	314,211	250,201	115,052	12,229	53,495	215,287	209,978	205,844
Russia	157,372	219,162	180,215	161,323	75,578	8,392	67,491	158,943	125,728	110,529
Taiwan	150,720	204,704	183,341	155,150	25,750	1,398	35,680	207,490	208,317	211,489
New Zealand	120,100	181,081	159,229	116,603	44,125	482	19,947	149,010	128,366	106,914
Papua New Guinea	112,824	156,138	124,492	76,471	22,509	31,703	20,975	78,433	142,648	141,299
Hong Kong	102,036	131,140	56,302	13,885	7,086	2,432	2,625	50,324	91,182	98,272
Saudi Arabia	100,689	156,318	135,643	107,684	47,472	2,053	31,906	157,512	165,912	166,111
Italy	97,115	146,360	131,149	104,393	47,415	2,339	13,260	91,229	94,288	90,022
Spain	86,742	140,245	142,247	106,581	51,563	3,255	11,829	83,373	85,560	81,690
Thailand	68,059	112,137	119,664	111,786	61,128	3,992	21,303	136,699	124,153	106,510
Canada	66,888	97,558	87,889	83,696	36,042	1,242	23,200	103,616	97,908	96,139
Vietnam	56,447	87,398	106,630	121,879	68,067	2,008	19,608	96,024	75,816	77,466
Turkey	53,345	66,902	50,051	30,433	14,424	1,122	6,038	23,883	20,861	34,433
Poland	38,974	68,100	53,907	41,988	18,401	752	9,055	41,637	31,437	32,704
Switzerland	38,221	60,616	58,205	48,459	23,192	782	8,362	57,484	60,293	61,191
Belgium	36,705	55,493	52,826	42,888	21,120	798	5,902	46,780	50,050	48,477
Myanmar	35,373	57,147	49,255	40,920	22,637	3,093	12,669	46,381	28,612	48,133
Denmark	30,091	44,309	42,141	39,555	20,913	557	10,533	45,090	46,825	43,721
Pakistan	28,718	36,348	23,150	14,264	5,247	974	4,110	14,663	13,448	11,424
Portugal	24,664	41,193	37,350	32,029	14,393	476	6,245	35,434	36,804	33,223
Ireland	24,585	39,607	38,676	34,466	16,003	291	5,167	28,602	28,742	29,400
Sweden	24,006	38,719	40,297	37,481	19,885	3,516	17,600	56,402	50,381	51,417
Kazakhstan	23,923	24,424	19,403	8,198	2,282	378	3,735	9,781	7,955	7,219
Brazil	22,389	34,497	32,031	29,497	14,855	952	5,945	30,232	26,503	32,403
Austria	22,171	34,095	39,041	34,984	17,708	2,103	4,858	28,476	29,492	27,208
South Africa	20,870	36,548	33,135	31,872	13,267	572	15,142	47,657	41,962	38,073
Ukraine	20,796	30,688	27,672	22,204	11,428	3,044	16,491	35,537	26,697	32,964
Brunei	20,764	31,797	19,796	13,518	4,798	144	2,701	19,278	17,279	23,455
Czech Republic	17,578	27,209	22,741	18,388	7,607	496	6,178	23,941	22,848	20,125
Norway	16,565	23,721	22,170	19,577	10,069	336	5,072	23,886	24,906	22,838
Romania	15,746	27,191	27,030	25,031	9,896	510	4,320	18,650	14,092	18,787
Hungary	13,020	21,042	19,234	16,689	6,384	218	3,664	14,218	13,434	12,600
Uzbekistan	10,715	10,480	8,130	5,283	1,393	68	1,586	3,756	3,548	4,057
Mongolia	9,635	9,708	4,850	2,323	706	12	1,483	4,260	3,679	2,414
Total	10,578,286	15,386,646	13,902,420	11,677,825	5,889,031	1,557,530	4,052,923	16,106,954	15,810,305	14,039,799

Between January and November 2024, Indonesia recorded 12.66 million foreign visitor arrivals, the most in five years and about 20.7% more than the same period in 2023, according to Statistics Indonesia (BPS).

== See also ==
- All Indonesia Arrival Card
- Visa requirements for Indonesian citizens
- Indonesian passport
- Refugees in Indonesia
- Tourism in Indonesia
