= Identity card (France) =

National identity card of France

French national identity card Carte nationale d’identité
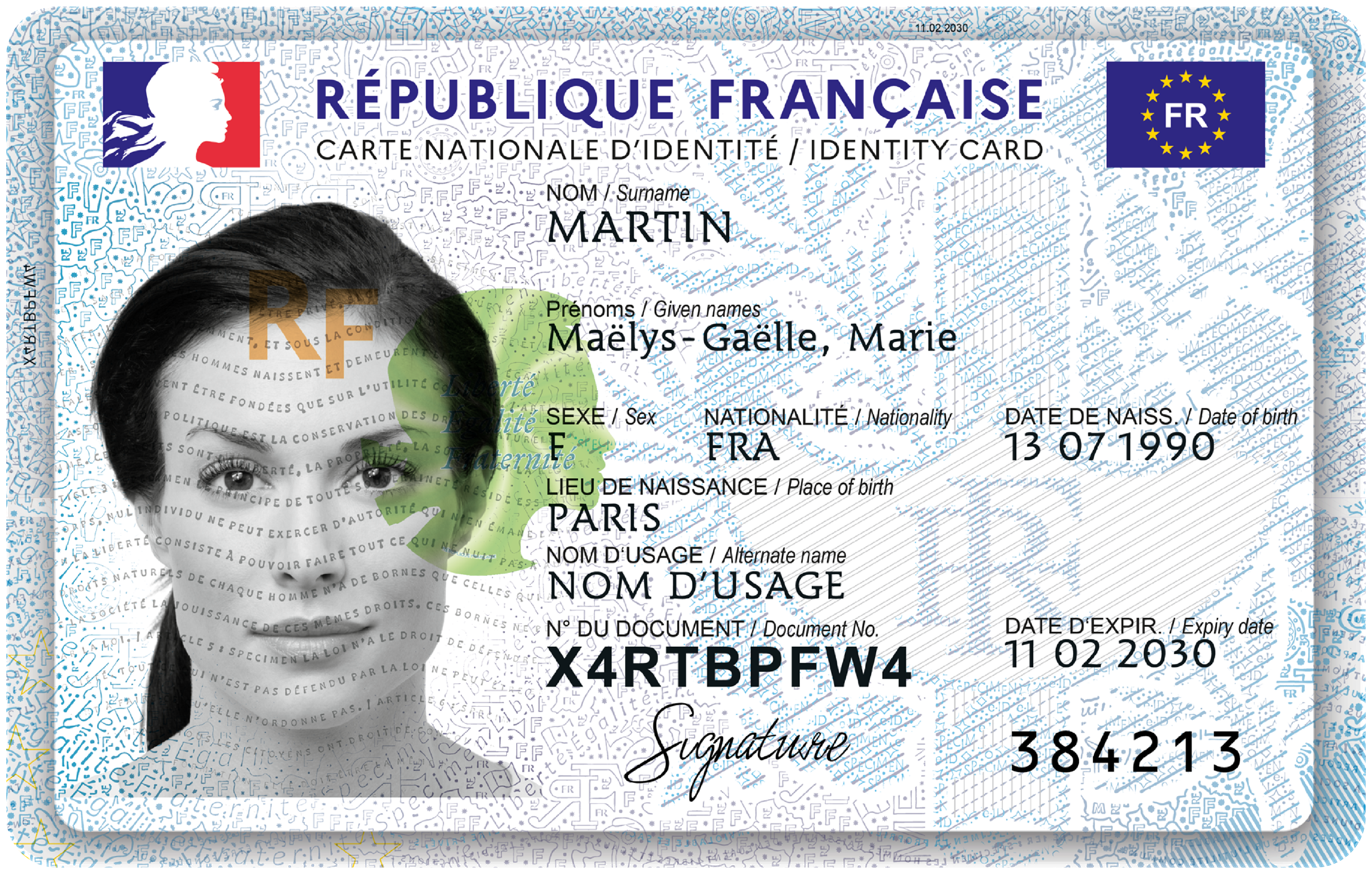
- Front of the card

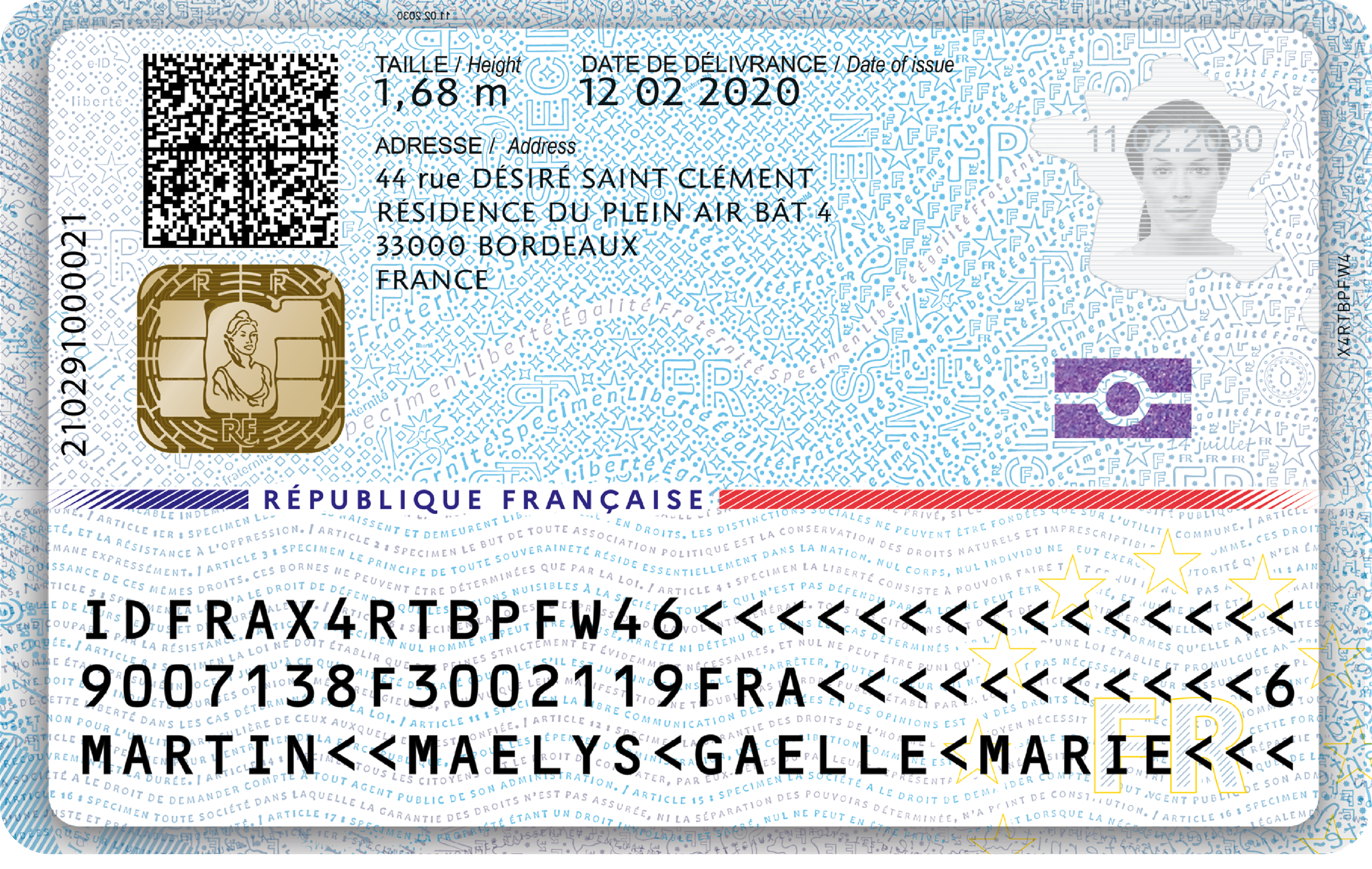
- Back of the card
- Type: Identity card, optional replacement for passport in the listed countries
- Issued by: France
- Valid in: European Union and the rest of Europe (except Belarus, Russia, Ukraine and United Kingdom) Anguilla (max 24 hours, 72 hours for Saint Martin residents); Canada (for SPM residents arriving from SPM); Dominica (max 14 days); Egypt; Georgia; Mauritius (for Reunion residents arriving from Reunion); Montserrat; Saint Lucia; Turkey
- Expiration: 10 years

The French national identity card or simply Identity card (French: carte nationale d’identité or CNI) is an official identity document consisting of an electronic ID-1 card bearing a photograph, name and address. While the identity card is non-compulsory, all persons must possess some form of valid government-issued identity documentation.

Identity cards, valid for a period of 10 years, are issued by the local préfecture, sous-préfecture, mairie (in France) or in French consulates (abroad) free of charge. A fingerprint of the holder is taken, which is stored in paper files and which can only be accessed by a judge in closely defined circumstances. A central database duplicates the information on the card, but strict laws limit access to the information and prevent it being linked to other databases or records.

The card may be used to verify identity and nationality and may also be used as a travel document within Europe (except Belarus, Russia, Ukraine and United Kingdom) as well as French overseas territories, Anguilla, Egypt, Turkey, Georgia, Dominica (max 14 days), Montserrat and Saint Lucia instead of a French passport. The cards are widely used for other purposes — for example, when opening a bank account, or when making a payment by cheque.

== History ==
While passports have been issued in France, under one form or another, since the Middle Ages, the identity card is a 20th-century innovation. The first ID was issued to foreigners in residence in France in 1917, in order to control the foreign population in a time of war and spy scare. The first card for Frenchmen was created by the Police Prefect of the Seine département, then the Paris local authority, in 1921. This carte d'identité des Français was a non-compulsory ID document and was only issued in the Paris region.

Following defeat in the Battle of France, the Vichy government created a new national identity card under the law of October 27, 1940. This new ID was compulsory for every French person over the age of 16. A central record was also instituted. From 1942, French Jews had the word "Jew" added to their card in red, which helped the Vichy authorities identify 76,000 for deportation as part of the Holocaust.

Under the decree 55-1397 of October 22, 1955 a revised non-compulsory card, the carte nationale d'identité (CNI) was introduced, and the central records abandoned. With the introduction of lamination in 1988 it was renamed the carte nationale d’identité sécurisée (CNIS) (secure national identity card). In 1995 the cards were made machine-readable. It became free in 1998.

On 15 March 2021, a new electronic model has been released.

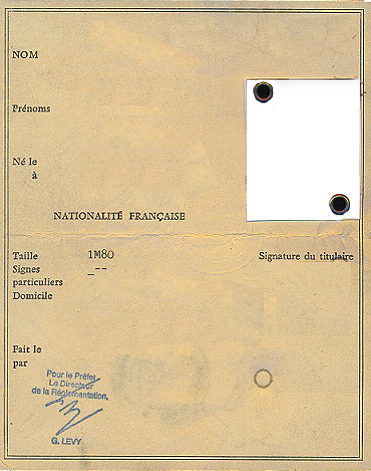
The card before 1988

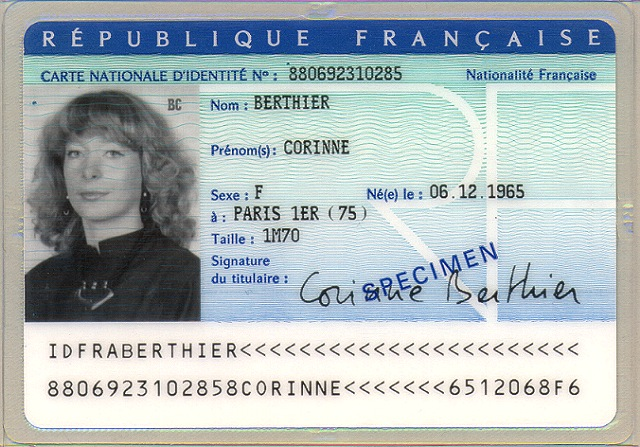
Front of the card issued between 1988 and 2021

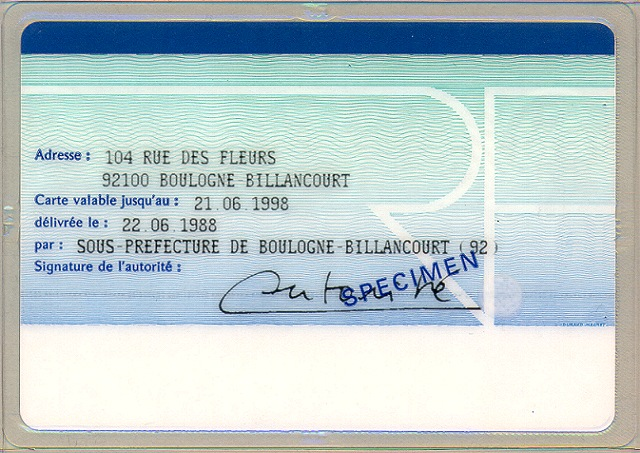
Back of the card issued between 1988 and 2021

== Use ==
=== Identification document ===
The French national identity card can be used as an identification document in France in situations such as opening a bank account, identifying oneself to government agencies, proving one's identity and regular immigration status to a law enforcement official etc.

Similarly, French citizens exercising their right to free movement in another EU/EEA member state or Switzerland are entitled to use their French national identity card as an identification document when dealing not just with government authorities, but also with private sector service providers. For example, if a supermarket in Ireland refuses to accept a French national identity card as proof of age when a French citizen attempts to purchase an age-restricted product, and insists on the production of an Irish passport, driving license or other identity document, the supermarket would, in effect, be discriminating against this individual on this basis of his/her nationality in the provision of a service, thereby contravening the prohibition in Art 20(2) of Directive 2006/123/EC of discriminatory treatment relating to the nationality of a service recipient in the conditions of access to a service which are made available to the public at large by a service provider.

In practice, the ID card can often be used for various identification purposes worldwide, such as for age verification in bars or checking in at hotels.

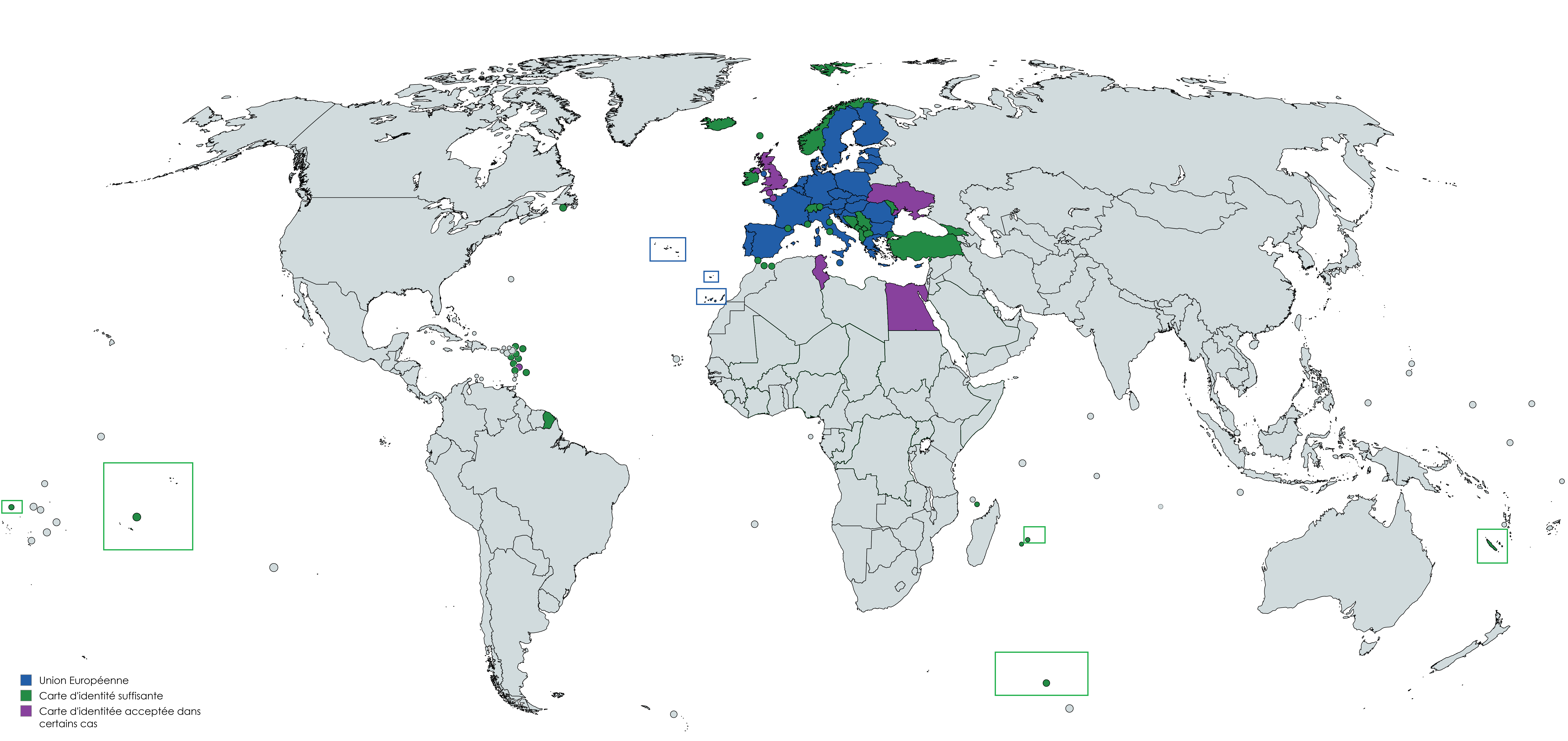
Territories where the French Identity Card is sufficient to travel.

=== Travel document ===
The French national identity card can be used as a travel document (instead of a French passport) to/from the following countries:

- (European Union) All countries in Europe except Belarus, Russia, Ukraine. In the United Kingdom, a passport is required, except for Gibraltar, the Channel Islands, Northern Ireland for land arrivals, and some European residents in the UK.
- (France) French overseas territories (Saint Pierre and Miquelon, Saint Martin, Saint Barthélémy, Guadeloupe, Martinique, French Guiana, Réunion, Mayotte, New Calédonie, Wallis and Futuna, French Polynesia, French Southern and Antarctic Lands. Note that some flights to these territories might require a stopover to a country where a passport could be required.
- Anguilla (max 24 hours, 72 hours for St Martin residents)
- Canada (only for residents of Saint-Pierre-et-Miquelon arriving directly from Saint-Pierre-et-Miquelon)
- Dominica (max 14 days)
- Montserrat
- Saint Lucia
- Egypt (a passport photo must be supplied to the border authorities upon entry)
- Georgia
- Turkey
- Mauritius (only for Reunion residents arriving directly from Réunion)

The identity card also grants access to the following European territories: Madeira, Azores, Canary Islands, Ceuta, Melilla, Faroe Islands, and Svalbard.

Previously, the Dominican Republic, Morocco, Saint Vincent and the Grenadines, Senegal, Sint Maarten, Tunisia and the United Kingdom permitted French citizens to travel to their countries on the strength of a French national identity card alone. Greenland does not accept French or European ID cards.

Prior to 1 January 2013, unaccompanied minors under the age of 18 who travelled outside metropolitan France using their French national identity cards were required to obtain an autorisation de sortie du territoire (AST). In order to obtain an AST, one of the minor's legal ascendant(s) had to visit the local mayor's office. On 1 January 2013, the obligation to obtain an AST was removed, and all minors are now able solely to use their French national identity cards when leaving/re-entering France without a legal ascendant. However, whilst the Border Police unit of the French National Police no longer require an AST from the legal ascendant(s) of an unaccompanied minor when he/she leaves or re-enters France, the border authorities of other countries may require the minor to present some form of written approval from his/her legal ascendant(s) before admitting him/her.

=== Validity ===
Prior to 1 January 2014, French national identity cards were issued with a maximum period of validity of 10 years.

On 1 January 2014, the period of validity of new cards issued to adults was increased from 10 to 15 years.

In addition, on the same day, a retroactive change in the period of validity came into effect by virtue of Decree 2013-1188. As a result, all French national identity cards issued between 2 January 2004 and 31 December 2013 to adults had their period of validity automatically extended from 10 years to 15 years. This extension took place without the need for any physical amendment to the expiry date which appears on eligible cards — for example, the holder of a French national identity card issued on 1 February 2004 (when he/she was already an adult) will actually be valid until 1 February 2019 automatically without the need for any amendment to the card (even though it states on the card that it will expire on 1 February 2014).

As of 15 March 2021, the new ID card lasts 10 years.

== Design ==
The card measures 105 x 74 mm. The paper card was laminated and had rounded corners until a new credit card sized plastic format was introduced as part of an overhaul in 2021. All the information on the card was given in the French language only until English was added with the new card design.

Whilst French passports and residence permits (issued to non-EU/EEA/Swiss citizens residing in France) contain an RFID chip, the design of the French national identity card remained unchanged from 1994 to 2021 and so cards were issued without an RFID chip (unlike a number of other EU member states which have updated the design of their national identity cards to include an RFID chip) until 2021. Whilst fingerprints are collected as part of the application process for the card, fingerprint images were neither printed on the card nor stored in an RFID chip embedded within the card.

=== Front side ===
The front side of the previous design (used from 1994 to 2021) featured the words "RÉPUBLIQUE FRANÇAISE" across the top and "Carte nationale d'identité/ National Identity Card" as well on cards issues since 2021 on the front, plus the following information:

- Card number
- Nationality (French)
- Photograph of the holder
- Surname
- Given name(s)
- Sex
- Date of birth (dd.mm.yyyy)
- Place of birth (If born in France, only the name and number of the département)
- Height (in metres, on the back of the new cards)
- Signature of holder

At the bottom of the front side (the back on the new design) is a two-line machine readable zone.

=== Machine-readable zone ===
The format of the first row is:

positions	length	chars	meaning
1	1	alpha	I
2	1	alpha	Type, at discretion of states (D in that case)
3–5	3	alpha	FRA // issuing country (ISO 3166-1 alpha-3 code with modifications)
6–30	25	alpha	Card holder's last name followed by '<' symbols to fill any unused space
31-33	3	alpha+num	Digits 5-7 of ID card number, department of issuance.
34-36	3	num	Office of issuance
31-36	6	alpha	On some cards 31-36 will instead be filled with <<<<<<

The format of the second row is:

positions	length	chars	meaning
1-4	4	num	Digits 1-2 are year of issuance, 3-4 are month of issuance
5-7	3	alpha+num	Department of issuance. Same as characters 31-33 on the first line.
8–12	5	num	Assigned by the Management Center in chronological order in relation to the place of issue and the date of application.
13	1	num	Check digit over digits 1–12
14–27	14	alpha	First name followed by given names separated by two filler characters
28-33	6	num	Birth date (YYMMDD)
34	1	num	Check digit over digits 28-33
35	1	alpha	Gender (M or F)
36	1	num	Check digit over digits 1-36 in first row combined with digits 1-35 in second row

=== Rear side ===
The rear side contains the following information:

- Residential address of the holder
- Date of expiry (dd.mm.yyyy, on the front of new cards)
- Date of issue (dd.mm.yy)
- Issuing authority
- Signature of the issuing authority
- Credit card like microchip and datamatrix code on cards issued since 2021

== See also ==
- National identity cards in the European Economic Area
- Biometric passport
- Schengen Information System
