= Directorate General of Immigration =

Indonesian government agency

- Direktorat Jenderal Imigrasi
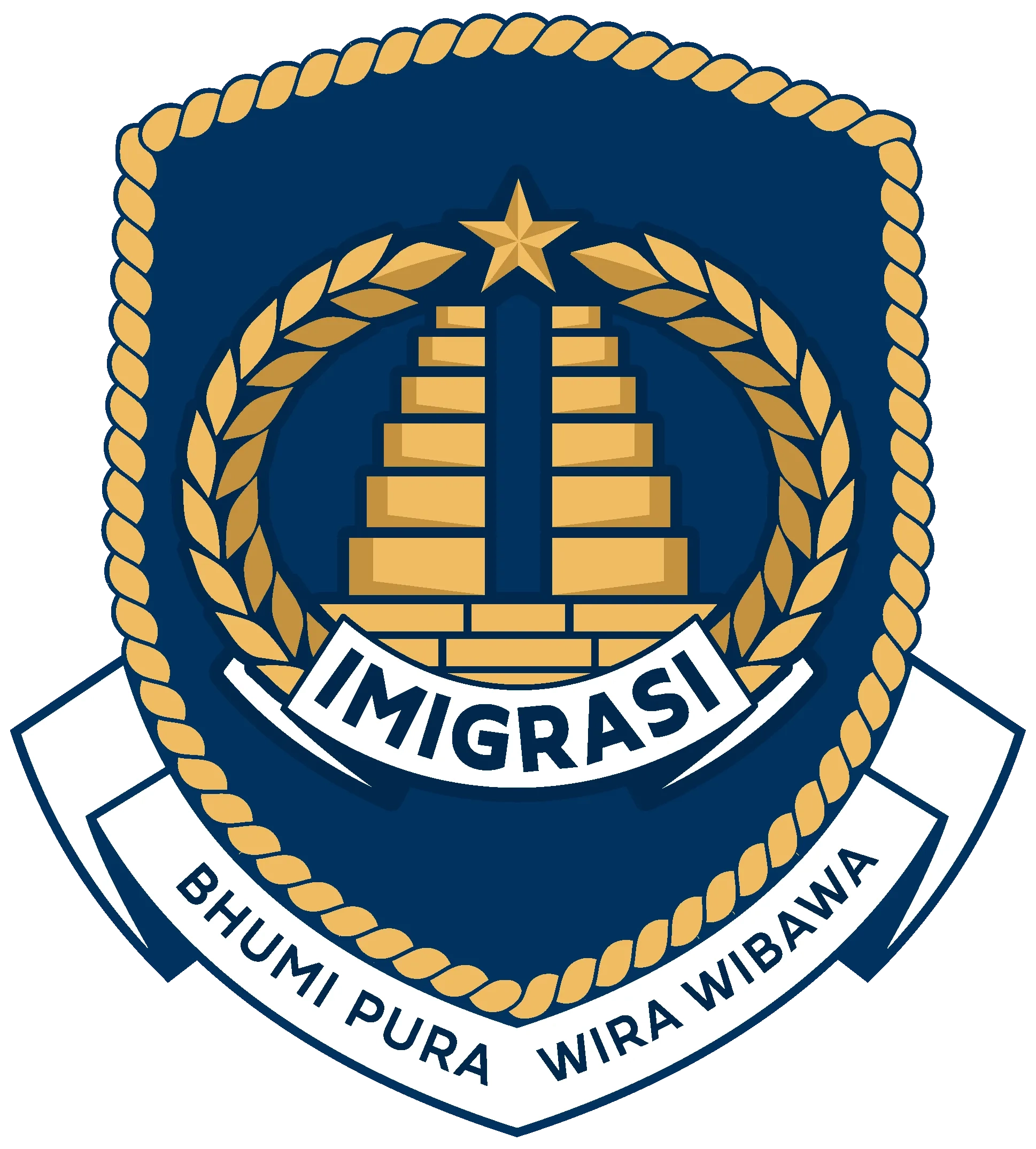

Agency overview
- Formed: 26 January 1950
- Jurisdiction: Government of Indonesia
- Headquarters: Jl. H. R. Rasuna Said Kav.X-6 Kuningan; Jakarta Selatan, Jakarta, Indonesia
- Parent Agency: Ministry of Immigration and Correction
- Website: www.imigrasi.go.id

The Directorate General of Immigration (Indonesian: Direktorat Jenderal Imigrasi abbreviated Imigrasi) is an Indonesian government agency under the Ministry of Immigration and Correction that serves the community in the field of immigration.

== Task and functions ==
=== Main task ===
To carry out the main task of Ministry of Law and Human Rights in the field of immigration, based on the policy determined by Minister, develop government policy related with the immigration, and standardization in immigration operational procedure.

=== Function ===
To carry out the main task, Directorate General of Immigration has the function of:

- Develop government policy in immigration, which consist of travel documents, visa, residency permit, work permit, immigration intelligence, law enforcement in immigration, inter-government cooperation and immigration information system.
- Executor of government policy in immigration.
- Develop standard, norms, procedure, and criterion in immigration.
- Provide technical support and evaluation
- Conduct administrative task in Directorate General of Immigration

== Organisation ==
The organisation of Directorate General of Immigration consist of 1 Headquarter, 33 Division on Regional office of ministry of law and human rights, 115 Immigration office, 13 Detention house, 19 Immigration attaché on Indonesian embassy.

Its organisational structure comprises the following components:

- Directorate General of Immigration, position held by Director General
- Secretariat of Directorate General of Immigration
- Directorate of Immigration Traffic
- Directorate of Supervision and Immigration Enforcement
- Directorate of Immigration Cooperation
- Directorate of Immigration Intelligence
- Directorate of Resident permit and immigration status.
- Directorate of Immigration Information System
- Immigration Attaché

== Visa policy of Indonesia ==
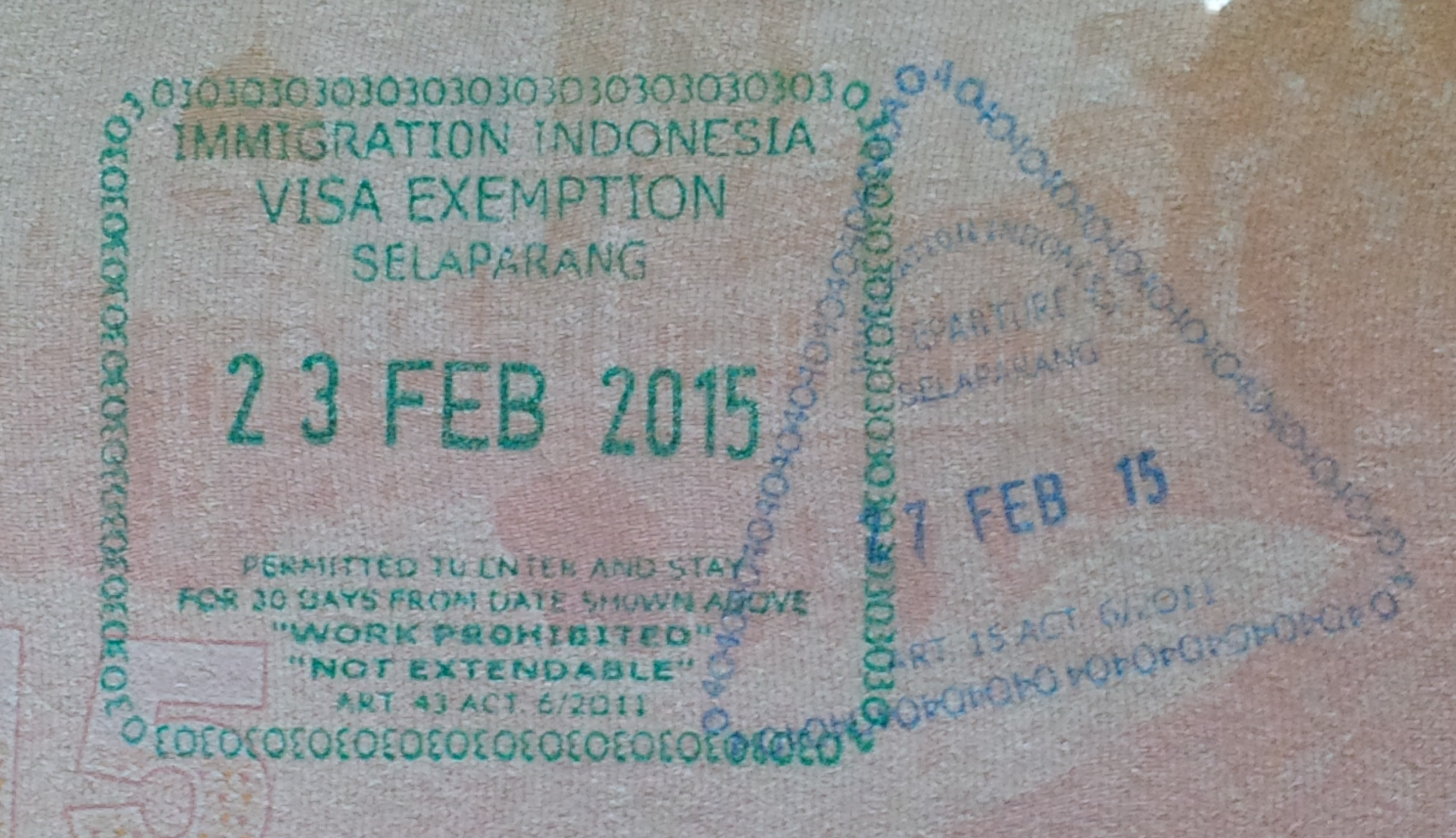
Entry and exit stamps for Indonesia.

Visitors to Indonesia must obtain a visa from one of the Indonesian diplomatic missions unless they come from one of the visa exempt countries. All visitors must hold a passport valid for 6 months as well as a valid return ticket. Passport with validity of more than 3 months can be accepted in special cases or business travel. The immigration officer at the port of entry may ask the passenger to produce any necessary documents (such as hotel reservation and proof of finance).

== Travel document ==
=== Passport ===
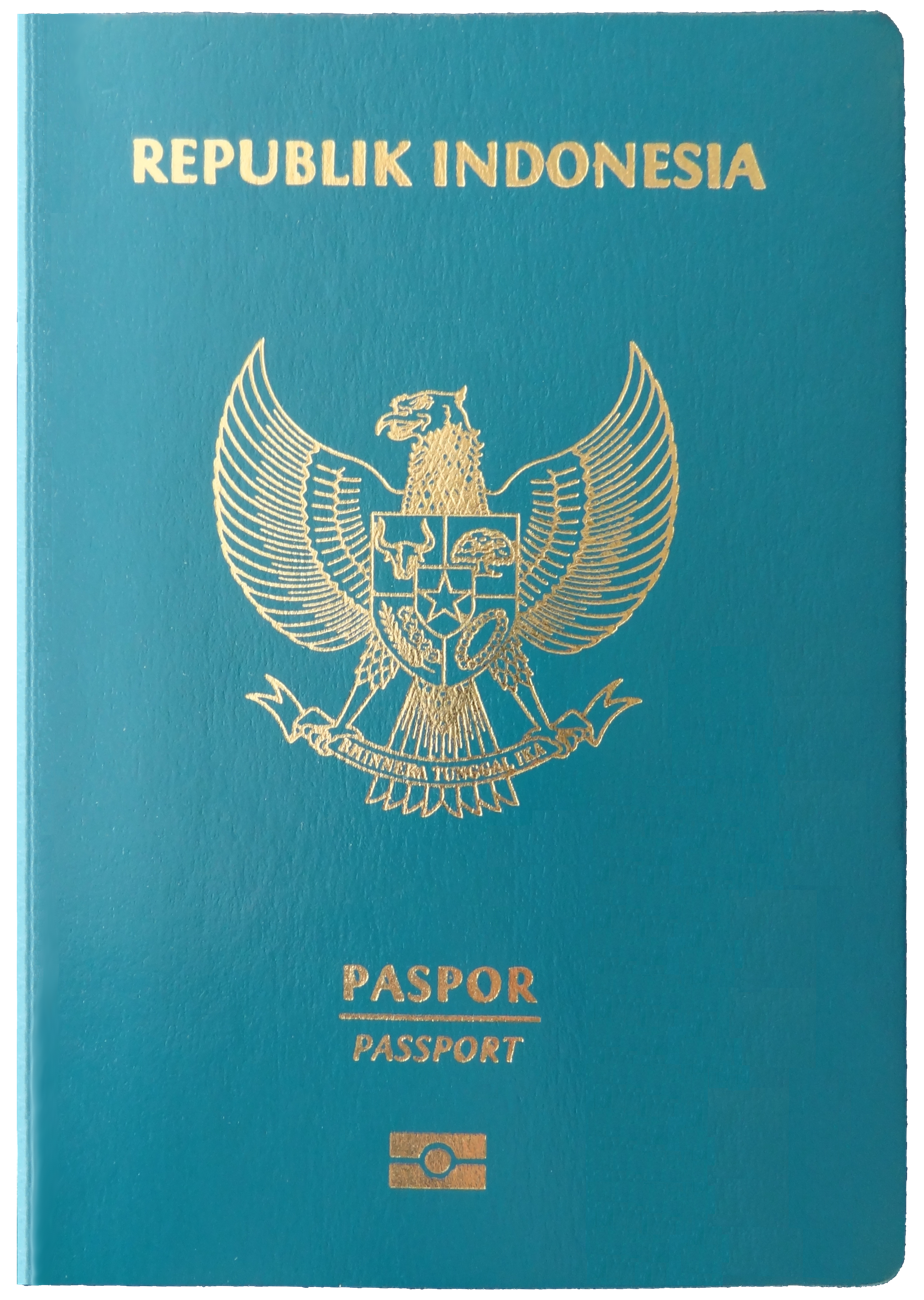
Indonesian passport

Indonesian passport is a travel document issued by the Government of Indonesia to Indonesian citizens residing in Indonesia or overseas. The main governing body with regards to the issuance of passports and possessions, withdrawal, and related matters is the Directorate General of Immigration under Ministry of Law and Human Rights. Indonesia is one among many countries in the world that does not recognize multiple citizenship for its citizens and such citizens will automatically lose her/his Indonesian citizenship if another citizenship is acquired voluntarily. Special exceptions allow newly born citizens to hold dual nationalities (including Indonesian) until his/her eighteenth birthday after which a choice of either nationalities should be decided. The latest Indonesian passports are bilingual: written in Indonesian and English.

=== Travel document in lieu of a passport ===
A Surat Perjalanan Laksana Paspor (SPLP, "Travel Document in Lieu of a Passport") is an Indonesian travel document issued to persons who do not have other appropriate travel documents, for the purpose of proceeding to and from Indonesia. There are several categories of SPLPs, covering both Indonesian citizens and non-Indonesian citizens.

=== Alien passport ===
The Paspor Orang Asing or Paspor Untuk Orang Asing is an alien's passport issued by Indonesia. It is a two-year, 24-page document issued to persons permanently resident in Indonesia who cannot obtain travel documents from any other country. It is referred to in English variously as "Indonesian Passport for Aliens", "Indonesian Stateless Person Passport", or "Indonesian Stateless Travel Document".

== See also ==
- Immigration Polytechnic
