= Driving licence in Spain =

- Type: Driving Licence
- Issued by: Spanish Directorate-General for Traffic
- Purpose: Authorisation
- Expiration: Valid for 10 years

In Spain, a driving licence is an official document which authorises the holder to operate motor vehicles. It is issued by the Directorate-General for Traffic (DGT).

As Spain is a member of the EU and EEA, Spanish driving licences are European driving licences, adhering to Directive 2006/126/EC, and are valid throughout the European Economic Area.

== Obtaining a driver's licence ==
The Spanish driving licence can be obtained after finishing a driving school and passing a two-stage test, the theory test and road test. Primary school diploma is also required to obtain valid driver's licence.

== Taking the Spanish driving test ==
Applications must be made at the Provincial Traffic Headquarters (Jefatura de Tráfico) of the province of residence.

=== Documents required ===
- A certificate of mental and physical fitness issued by the Authorized Drivers Check Centre (Centro de Reconocimiento de Conductores Autorizado) with one photo. This certificate is valid for a period of 90 days
- Application form and application fee (Note: Official information states that these forms are available on the DGT website however this is not the case. Forms should be collected and filled in before the application process begins)
- Two passport-sized photographs (32 x 26 mm)
- Photocopy (and original) of a Spanish National Identity Card, Spanish residence permit (Residencia) or a copy of the passport along with the NIE number (Número de Identificación de Extranjero)
- Proof of address in Spain dated within 3 months (empadronamiento) available from the local Town Hall
- Signed self-declaration in writing that there is no legal process pending nor licence suspension that forbids the right to drive
- Signed self-declaration in writing that no other licence of the same category is held

== Types of document ==
In Spain, there are 3 types of document pertaining to driving: the driving licence ("el permiso de conducir"), the driving permit ("la licencia de conducir") and "el permiso de circulación", which is applied to the vehicle rather than to the driver.

All drivers must be in possession of the document and take it with them whenever they drive. However, it is valid to take a photocopy of the original (if properly certified) or the Spanish national identity card. It is obligatory to show it to the authorities when they ask for it.

If the document has been issued in Spain, it will be valid for the whole of the European Union.

All driving documents have an expiration date, and when it is reached the driver must renew it by taking an aptitude test (similar to that taken when first obtaining it) to test that they are still physically fit to drive.

=== Driving licence ("el permiso de conducir") ===
The possession of a driving licence allows the driver to be able to drive the majority of vehicles.

The AM, A1, A2, A, and B licences have to be renewed every 10 years up until the age of 65, and from age 65 onward, every 5 years.

==== Types of licence ====
The driving licence is subdivided into classes. The class regulates the type of vehicle that the licence holder can drive:

===== AM =====
Allows for the driving of:

- Mopeds with 2 or 3 wheels and light vehicles with 4 wheels (50cc)

The minimum age to hold this licence is 15 years old. If transporting passengers, the driver must be 18 years old.

===== A1 =====
Allows for the driving of:

- Motorbikes of a maximum 125cc, a maximum power of 11kW and a maximum power-to-weight ratio of 0.1 kW/kg
- Motorised tricycles with a maximum power of 15kW.

A "B" class of licence which has been held for over 3 years allows the driving of these types of vehicle.

The minimum age to hold this licence is 16 years old. Holding this licence implies the possession of the AM licence.

To obtain this licence, 2 tests must be passed:

- Driving theory test (exempt if you hold any other licence)
- Specific A1 theory test
- Practical test on a closed track
- Practical test on the road

===== A2 =====
Allows for the driving of:

- Motorbikes with a maximum power of 35kW and a maximum power to weight ratio of 0.2kW/kg

The minimum age to hold this licence is 18 years old. Holding this licence implies the possession of the A1 licence.

To obtain this licence, 2 tests must be passed:

- Driving theory test (exempt if you hold any other licence)
- Specific theory test for motorbikes (exempt if you hold the A1 licence)
- Practical test of manoeuvres (on a closed track). This is divided into 3 parts: one exercise with the bike stopped, one at low speed and one at high speed (for a maximum of 25 seconds)
- Practical test on the road

===== A =====
Requires you to have been in possession of the A2 licence for a minimum of 2 years.

Allows for the driving of:

- Motorbikes of any power and weight
- All vehicles from the AM, A1 and A2 classes
- From 21 years old, motorised tricycles over 15kW

The minimum age to hold this licence is 20 years old. Holding this licence implies the possession of the A2 licence.

To obtain this licence, 2 tests must be passed:

- Theory: General theory (an hour and a half) and road awareness (an hour and a half)
- Practical: Manoeuvres on a closed track (4 hours) and driving on public roads (2 hours)

The practical test must be done on bikes with motors of no less than 600cc and with power of no less than 40kW.

===== B =====
Allows for the driving of:

- Cars whose weight does not exceed 3500kg and that are built for no more than 10 people (including the driver). Said cars can pull a trailer of a weight that does not exceed 750kg.

=== Driving permit ("la licencia de conducir") ===
The possession of the driving permit allows the holder to drive the following types of vehicle:

- Vehicles for people with reduced mobility (must be older than 18 if transporting passengers)
- Agricultural vehicles that do not exceed the maximum weight and size (must be older than 16 years of age)

The driving permit must be renewed every 10 years up until the age of 65. After 65, the driver must renew it every 5 years.

The driving permit will no longer be valid when the holder obtains the class B licence.

== See also ==
- European driving licence
- Vehicle registration plates of Spain
- Spanish identity card
- Spanish passport
