= Kareha =

Kareha is a Japanese word meaning "dried leaves." It may refer to:

- Koreisha mark, a mark put on Japanese cars to indicate that the driver is elderly, which also called "Kareha mark".
- Kareha (Shuffle!), a character in the Shuffle! video game series.
- Kareha, a popular 2channel-style anonymous board software package.
- Japanese name of a French song "Les Feuilles mortes". See Autumn Leaves (1945 song)
