= Newly licensed driver plate =

Provisional driving plates

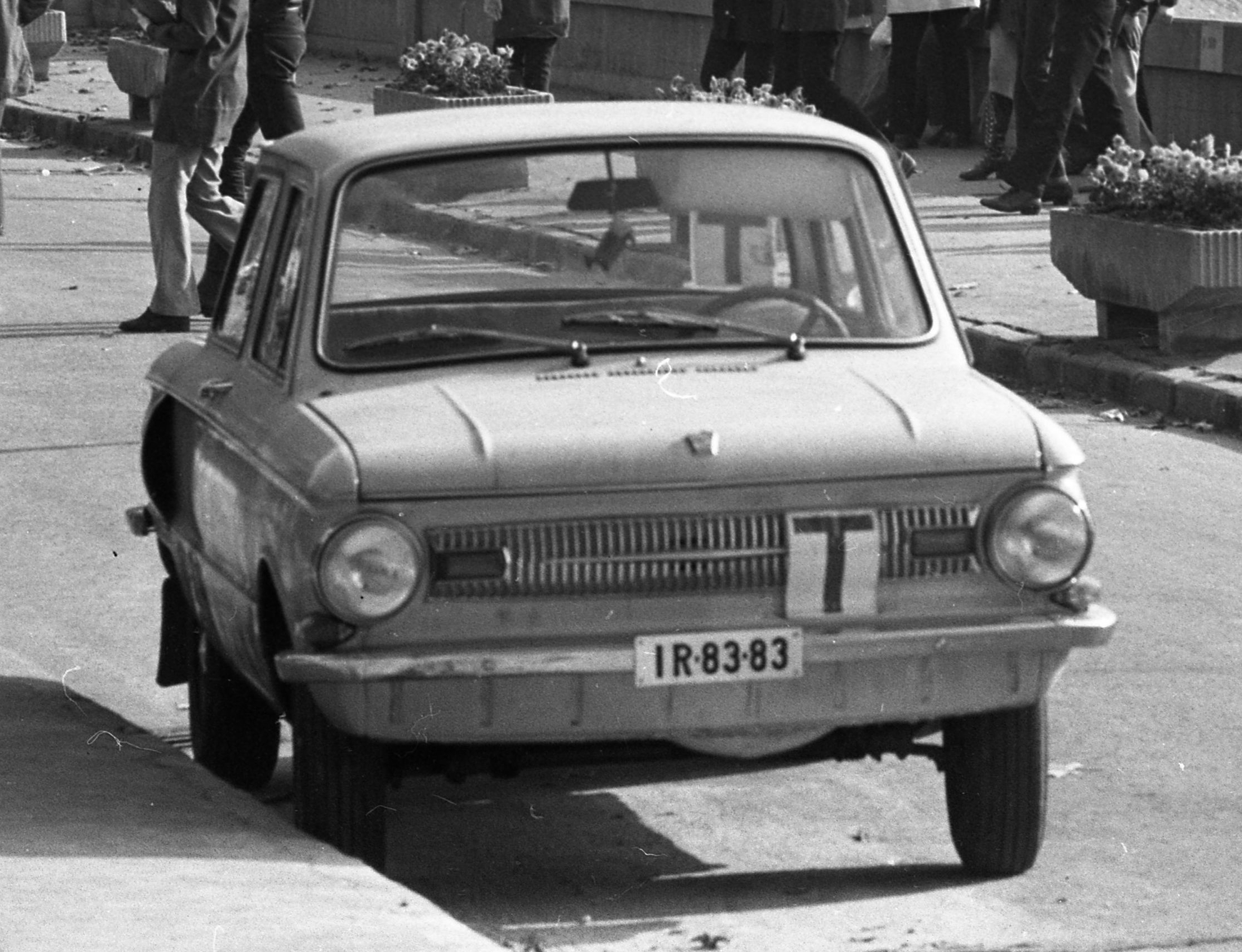
A ZAZ-966, with a Hungarian "T-plate" in 1972

A newly licensed driver plate is a plate which must be affixed to the front and/or back of a vehicle in many countries if its driver is a learner under instruction, or a motorcycle rider with provisional entitlement to ride restricted motorcycles. It is most commonly square plate bearing a sans-serif letter.

== Newly licensed drivers ==
=== Australia ===
In Australia the rules vary from state to state. A new driver holds a Learner licence/permit which has a minimum age of 16, or 15 and 9 months in some areas. This must then be held for a certain amount of time before a driving examination can be undertaken, usually 12 months later. After passing, the driver must display 'P' plates. Holders of a provisional/probationary licence may be restricted compared to fully licensed drivers in speed, blood alcohol limits, limits on the type and power of their car's engine (i.e., no more than 6 cylinders, no forced induction, kW per ton limits), and number of demerit points that can be accrued. VicRoads, the Victorian road authority, publish information for learner drivers on the L-Site.

Graduated Driver Licensing (GDL) first commenced in Australia in the mid-1960s with New South Wales introducing learner and provisional licences on January 4, 1966. In all states, newly licensed drivers are required by law to display P-plates for varying lengths of time. The P is usually a red or green letter on a white background or a white letter on a red or green background (Victoria and Western Australia only). In New South Wales, Queensland and Victoria there are two classes of provisional/probationary licence: red P-plates are for the first year after passing the Learner test, and then after passing a computerised test they are green for two to three years. Western Australia requires six months of red P-plates, where provisional drivers are under a 12 midnight–5 am curfew, and one and a half years of green P-plates.

On 1 July 2000, New South Wales introduced a three-stage Graduated Licensing Scheme (GLS):

1. Stage one is a learner licence with the requirement to complete 120 hours of supervised driving, including 20 hours of nighttime driving. A learner licence must be held for a minimum of 12 months before a practical driving test can be taken in order to proceed to a P1 probationary licence.
2. Stage two is a one-year P1 probationary licence (with red P plates).
3. Stage three is a two-year P2 probationary licence (with green P plates).

On 1 July 2008, Victoria introduced the Graduated Licensing Systems (GLS).

1. Stage one is a one-year P1 probationary licence (with red P plates).
2. Stage two is a three-year P2 probationary licence (with green P plates).
3. P1 drivers are prohibited from using a mobile phone of any kind.
4. P1 drivers are banned from towing, except for work or when supervised.
5. P1 drivers can carry no more than one passenger aged between 16 years of age and less than 22 years, unless the passengers are immediate family members.
6. A good driving record will be necessary to progress to the next licence stage.

As of July 2007, newly issued Queensland drivers licences have new restrictions for those under 25 years of age. Learners must first log 100 hours of driving experience (of which 10 must be undertaken at night) before taking their practical driving examination. Learners can boost this experience by taking professional lessons, which counts for 3 times the hours, for up to 10 hours (or 30 logbook hours.) After a period of one year, provisional drivers must then pass a hazard-perception test to move from red to green P-Plates, where previously only a 3-year duration was required. New restrictions also prevent any under-25, Queensland provisional licence-holder from carrying more than one passenger under the age of 21 who is not an immediate family member, between the hours of 11 pm and 5 am.

==== Speed limits ====
L-platers and provisional drivers (P-platers) are restricted in some states to lower speeds.

- Northern Territory L-platers are restricted to a maximum speed of 80 km/h (50 mph);
- New South Wales L-platers, P1 drivers and Tasmanian L-platers are restricted to 90 km/h (56 mph);
- South Australian L and P-platers (both P1 and P2), New South Wales P2 drivers, Northern Territory P-platers and Western Australian L-platers are restricted to 100 km/h (62 mph);
- Queensland, Victoria, and the ACT make no speed restrictions beyond the speed limits applicable to all drivers. WA P-platers and Tasmanian P2 drivers may also drive to the posted speed limit.

=== Canada ===
Motor vehicles are provincially regulated in Canada, and so regulations vary by province. In British Columbia, following the instructional phase and after passing a road test, new drivers are required to show a green N (for novice) plate until they have passed an additional road test, usually after 24 months.

In British Columbia, a red L (for learner) plate is required for 12 months before the N can be issued, and new drivers with this marking are not permitted to drive without a licensed driver over the age of 25 present in the vehicle.

=== France ===
After learners pass their driving test, they must display a A-plate (for apprenti), of round shape with white background and red letter, for three years (shortened to two years for those who took part in the conduite accompagnée program – a program allowing learner to drive with a licensed driver in the passenger seat and starting three years before the minimum driving age). They must follow a different speed limit: 110 km/h (68 mph) on highways (instead of 130 km/h [81 mph]), 80 km/h (50 mph) on national roads with road dividers (instead of 90 km/h [56 mph]) and 100 km/h (62 mph) on every road normally limited to 110 km/h [68 mph].

=== Hong Kong ===
In Hong Kong, a person is allowed to apply for a learners' licence for private cars, light goods vehicles, motorcycles and motor tricycles once he or she has reached 18 years old. For learners' licence of other vehicle classes, applicants must be over 21 years old and hold a valid full driving licence or a probationary driving license for one year. Holders of a learners' licence in Hong Kong must be accompanied by a licensed driving instructor (except for people driving motorcycles and motor tricycles) and must display L-plates at front and rear of the vehicle while driving. The L-plate is printed red on a white background with an alphabet "L" and a Chinese character "學", which literally means "learning".

A one-year probationary period has been applied to newly qualified motorcycle drivers since 2000 and to private car/light goods vehicle drivers since 2009. During the probationary period, drivers must display a red P-plate at the front and back of the car, must not exceed a speed of 70 km/h (43 mph) if the speed limit of the road is higher than 70 km/h (43 mph), and must not use the rightmost lane on expressways having three or more lanes. Motorcycle riders may not carry passengers during the probational period. A driver who commits a minor traffic offence during the probationary period will see his period extended by six months, and a second minor offence or a single serious offence will cancel the license entirely, forcing him to retake the driving test for another probationary licence. Drivers who complete the probationary period without committing any offences are eligible for a full-class driving licence. Licences for all other classes of vehicles require the applicant to finish his probationary period.

=== India ===
All new drivers in India, upon receipt of a provisional licence, must display L plates at all times (usually on the front and rear of the vehicle) and be accompanied by another driver who has held a full and valid licence for the type of vehicle being driven and also be in a position to control the vehicle.

After learners have passed the driving test for the appropriate vehicle, they can switch to a permanent driving license.

=== Isle of Man ===
Licences may be obtained from the age of 16 and provisional licences require the display of L-plates (similarly to Ireland and the UK). For one year after obtaining a full licence, R-plates (for restricted) must be displayed and speed is restricted to 50 mph (80 km/h) (even on unrestricted Manx roads). Unlike the R-plate in Northern Ireland, an Isle of Man R-plate is a red R on a square white plate.

=== Ireland ===
In Ireland, the minimum age for a learner's permit is seventeen. Before being awarded this permit, the applicant must pass a computerized Driver Theory Test, and after passing the test, the probationer must display L-plates (one front, and one rear) and be accompanied by a driver who has held a full licence for at least two years. Since 2008, all learner drivers have faced a fine of up to €1,000 for a first offence and €2,000 for a second if they fail to display L-plates.

All learner permit holders, with the exception of those who hold learner permits in category W (work vehicles/land tractors), must display 'L' plates while they are driving. The letter L should be at least 15 cm (6 in) high and appear as red on a white background, in clearly visible vertical positions to the front and rear of the vehicle.

A learner's permit is valid for two years, and may be renewed once without the holder having sat a driving test. After this, proof of an upcoming test appointment or a recent test failure is required for further renewal. A permit holder may not sit a test for at least six months after receiving their permit.

Prior to October 2007, a "provisional licence" was issued which had more lax restrictions - on its first renewal, the holder could drive unaccompanied (but must continue to display L plates), and the accompanying driver did not need any experience, just a full licence. The third or further renewals of the licence - e.g. after failing a test and the expiration of the second licence - brought back the accompaniment requirement. This unusual arrangement led to a situation where a learner driver, having failed his driving test on a 2nd Provisional, could legally drive away from the test center unaccompanied.

Prior to December 2007 an L-plate was not required for motorcyclists. A fluorescent tabard displaying an 'L' on the rear is now required for motorcyclists using a provisional licence or learner permit.

The new measures were introduced in an effort to improve road safety, and will be followed by the introduction of 'tiered licensing', with harsher rules applying to those holding a full licence for less than two years. However, the changes were not retroactive.

From 1 August 2014, a person granted a first full driving licence must display N-plates (Novice) on the vehicle for a period of 2 years. The legal requirements for an N plate are that it is not less than 15 centimetres (6") high in red on a white ground, in clearly visible vertical positions to the front and rear of the vehicle. However, there has been a trend amongst drivers, younger males in particular, who want to keep N plates discreet, whereby they trim the white background on the N plates, leaving just a narrow white border around the letter N or no border at all. The somewhat vague legal requirement implies that the prior may be legal as it does not specify a width for the border. Trimming of N plates generally occurs due to a perceived ‘embarrassment’ of them or the driver is driving a modified vehicle that they do not want attention drawn to.

=== Israel ===
==== During the studies ====
In Israel, the driving tutoring has to be performed by a special teacher, named "Driving teacher" (Hebrew: מורה נהיגה). The lessons are performed on a modified vehicle with additional controlling pedals at the front passenger seat: this allows the teacher to control the vehicle during lessons and prevent accidents. Additionally, auxiliary mirrors are fixed atop of side rear-view mirrors, providing the teacher with the rear views.

It is the teacher's responsibility to affix the L-plate before each lesson and to remove it after the lesson, therefore the L-plates are usually printed on PVC panels with magnetic base, which eases affixing and removal.

The Israeli L-plate shares the general design of Israeli information signs (square form, blue background). On the blue background is placed a white triangle pointing upwards, with black Hebrew letter "ל" in it, from Hebrew: למידה — "Learning".

==== After passing the exam ====
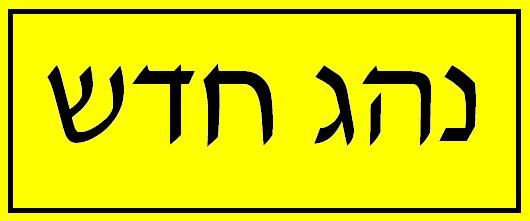
New driver P-plate in Israel

For two years after passing the exam, the driver is required to affix a rectangle P-plate bearing the words "new driver" in Hebrew (נהג חדש; optionally, נהגת חדשה for female driver, or נהג\ת חדש\ה that suits both male and female drivers). The law defines the plate as light-reflective with yellow background and black letters. It has to be fixed in a corner of the rear window, and there are lower limits on plate's size and width of the letters. The law restricts the usage of P-plates to new drivers only; the P-plate has to be affixed if and only if the person that drives the vehicle is a new driver.

There are several restrictions on the new driver. For the first three months after receiving the license, they may drive only if there is an experienced driver sitting in the front passenger's seat, and the law additionally defines the requirements for the driver to be called "experienced". The charges for violating traffic laws are much more heavy on the new driver; there is a list of traffic law violations that immediately cancel the new driver's license. Additional limitations apply on young drivers: if the new driver is younger than 21 years old, they may not transport more than two passengers without an experienced driver accompanying them in the front passenger's seat.

=== Japan ===
In Japan, new drivers must display a Shoshinsha mark (初心者マーク) (or Wakaba mark (若葉マーク)) on the front and rear of their vehicle for their first year, although drivers who consider themselves to be beginners are allowed to continue to display the mark after the year has passed. Although not related to driving experience, the Koreisha mark (高齢者マーク) is optional for drivers 70 years old or over and mandatory for 75 years or more. It would theoretically be possible to simultaneously display both a shoshinsha mark and a koreisha mark, for example if a 70-year-old were to be newly licensed.

=== Malaysia ===
In Malaysia, only cars approved by driving schools may be driven by Learner Drivers after passing the theory test. The car (typically a Perodua Kancil or Perodua Viva) is required to have at least one L-plate at the front and the back. In the case of motorcycles, Learner riders must affix an L-sticker onto the front and rear of their motorcycles. The learner's driving licence is renewable every 3 or 6 months but cannot be possessed for more than 2 years.

The L-plate is very similar to those used in the United Kingdom and Singapore, with the exception being that two background colors are issued which are blue color background (for all vehicles except motorcycles) and white color background (for motorcycles only). They are allowed to take their practical driving test after 1 month of obtaining the Learner's license.

After the learner drivers pass their practical driving tests, they are put under the 2-year probationary period before they may possess the Competent Driving Licence. During the probationary period, they are issued with Probationary Driving Licence and are required to place P-plates at the front and the back of their respective vehicles. They are subject to the Kejara demerit system, where those accumulating 10 points or more during the 2-year probationary period may risk their licences to be revoked. The P-plate design is similar to its L-counterpart, except that the background colour is red and the letter P is white. After the probationary period ends, the drivers are given a one-year grace period to upgrade their licences to Competent Driving Licence.

=== Spain ===
New drivers must display a standardized (15 cm × 19 cm, 6 in × 7 in), reflective green and white "L" plate on the lower left corner of the rear window for one year after obtaining their first driving license. They no longer have an additional speed restriction. Alcohol levels allowed are lower the first two years, and are the same as those for "professional" drivers.

Driving school cars sport a permanent blue and white "L" plate with the word prácticas 'practice' in red.

There are another method in Spain to obtain a license without going to a driving school. Is called 'Licencia de aprendizaje' Apprenticeship license It can only be obtained once and a close relative with the title of driving instructor is the one who can teach the classes. This is only valid for B class driver permit for others classes the student must enroll in a driver school. This cars sport a permanent red and white "L" plate with word prácticas 'practice' in red. It is not very common to see them.

=== Sweden ===
All new drivers learning to drive need to display a green sign (or a red plate if driving with a driving school) with the text "övningskör" (practice driving) and need to drive with a supervisor who needs to be at least 24 years of age and who has been a licensed driver for at least 5 consecutive years during the last 10 years. After passing both the theoretical and practical driving tests, the driver gets a provisional license for two years. If a holder of a provisional license commits a violation that would result in a suspension of a normal drivers license, the license is revoked, and the driver must retake the driving tests to be reinstated.

=== United Kingdom ===
English-language L plate

Welsh-language D plate

P plate, used in Great Britain

R plate, used in Northern Ireland

All new drivers in the United Kingdom, upon receipt of a provisional licence, must display L plates at all times and be accompanied by another driver who is over 21 years of age and has held a full and valid licence for the type of vehicle being driven for at least three years. In Wales either red L plates or red D plates (Welsh: dysgwr, 'learner') are permitted, due to the bilingual legislation in force within the country, while a learner is driving the vehicle. In Northern Ireland, drivers with L plates must not exceed 45 mph (72 km/h).

After learners have passed a driving test for the appropriate vehicle, they may opt to display green P-plates (P for probationary) (in England, Scotland or Wales) to show that they have less experience than other drivers. These plates are voluntary and not required by law or the Highway Code.

L plates are required to be displayed at all times whilst riding a motorcycle or moped of no more than 125 cc (7.6 cu in) after passing motorcycle compulsory basic training (CBT) but before passing a full motorcycle practical test.

==== Northern Ireland ====
Until 1 October 2026, in Northern Ireland, for one year after the passing of a car driving test, the driver was defined as a "restricted driver" who must not exceed 45 mph (72 km/h) and must display an "R-plate" consisting of an amber sans-serif R on a white background. Riders of medium-sized (category A2) and large (category A) motorcycles who pass their test after 19 January 2013 could ride at speeds in excess of 45 mph but will still be required to clearly display R plates. L-plates in Northern Ireland commonly have an R-plate as a reverse side.

In an attempt to improve road safety, from 1 October 2026, Northern Ireland moved to Graduated Driver Licensing for newly qualified drivers with two years of restrictions (deemed to be the period new drivers are most at risk of accidents and fatalities). There are no longer any additional speed restrictions on drivers.

For the initial six months after passing their driving test, a plate with a blue ‘R’ on a white background must be displayed. Late at night (between 11pm and 6am), new drivers under the age of 24, can have no more than one passenger in the car aged between 14 to 20 for the first six months. Passenger restrictions do not apply to immediate family members in the car. And the restrictions do not apply if someone aged 21 or over who has held a full driving licence for three years is in the passenger seat. For the remaining 18 months, a plate with a white ‘R’ on a blue background (the reverse of the first six months) must be displayed, but the late night passenger restrictions are lifted.

=== United States ===
==== New Jersey ====
In New Jersey, effective May 1, 2010, drivers under the age of 21 holding a learner's permit or probationary license must display 1-by-1/2-inch (2.5 cm × 1.3 cm) detachable red decals on the front and back license plates of their vehicles.

== Similar plates ==
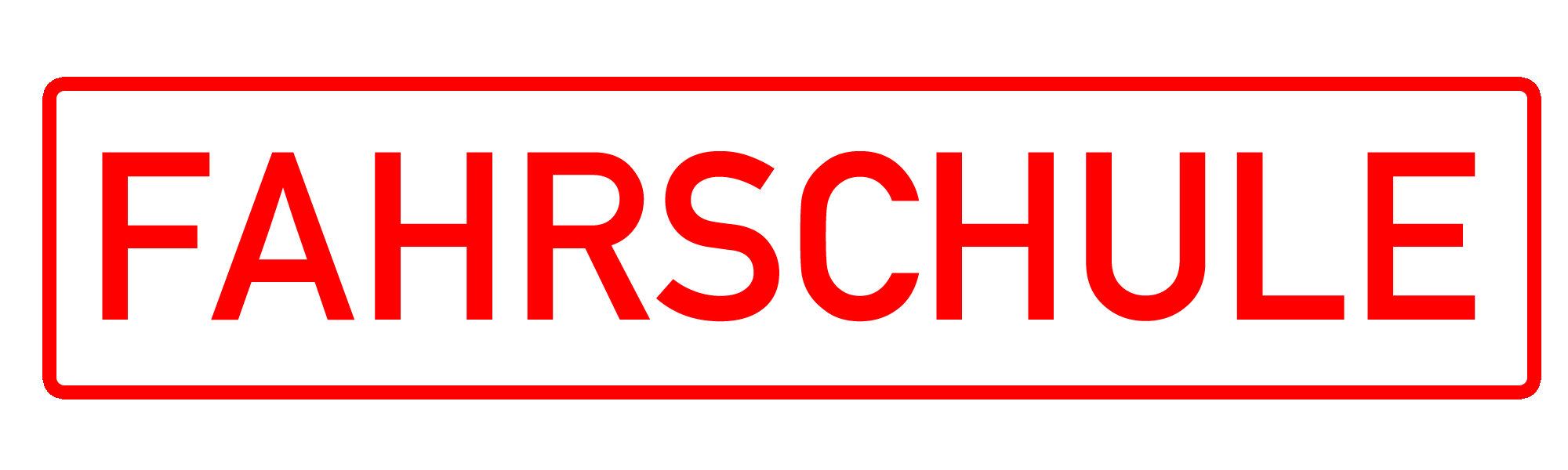
German driving school plate

Italian driving school plate

Elsewhere in the world, varying designs are used. In Germany, a usually red plate displaying the word Fahrschule (driving school) is placed on the vehicles during instruction. In Sweden, the plate is green or red (for driving schools) with the text övningskör (driving practice). In Czechoslovakia, a white L on a blue field, similar to the Swiss one, had been used, but many driving schools have stopped using them recently, instead tagging their cars with the word autoškola ("car school"). In Italy, driving schools' cars are tagged with the words scuola guida ("driving school"), and private cars with beginner drivers are tagged with a "P" capital letter: both signs are black on white reflective background. In Finland, a white triangle (equilateral with 16–25 cm sides) is required in the back of a vehicle used to give driving instruction. Between 1972 and 1996, new drivers were limited to less than 80 km/h (50 mph) in the first year, and had to use a white round "80" plaque (colloquially kahdeksankympin lätkä) in the rear window or as a sticker on the back of the vehicle.

== Plate designs ==
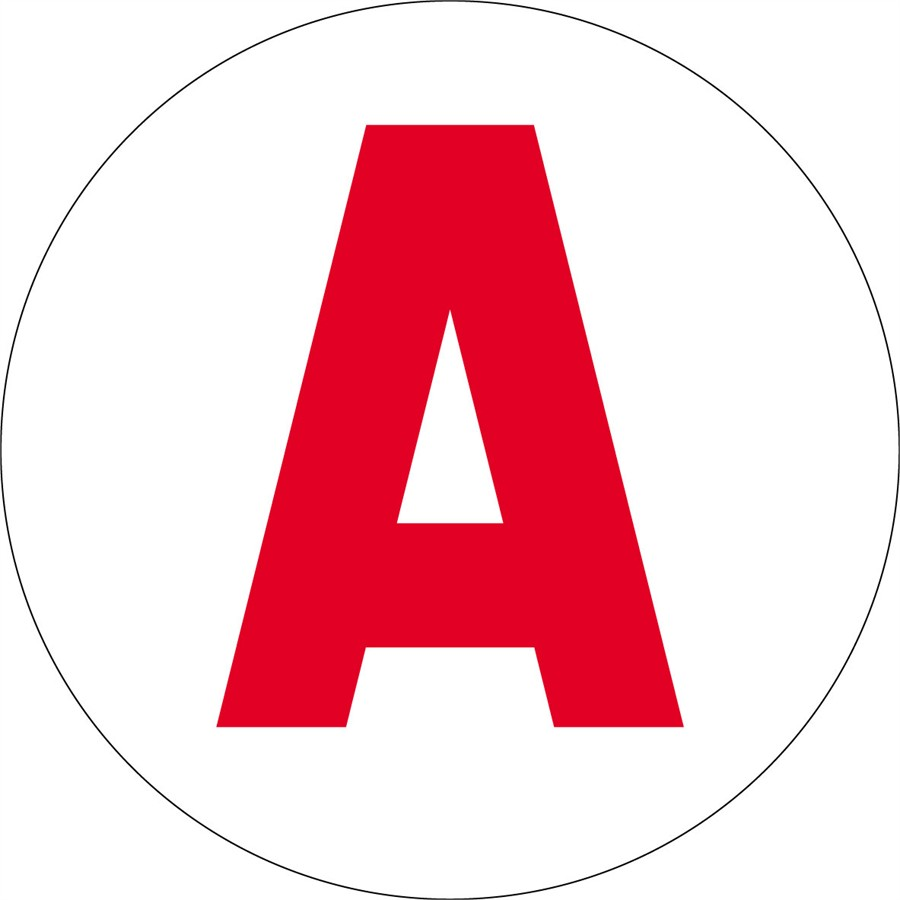
A French "A-disc". The letter "A" stands for apprenti ("learner")

A British, Irish, Indian, Malaysia, Norwegian, Singaporean or South African L-plate

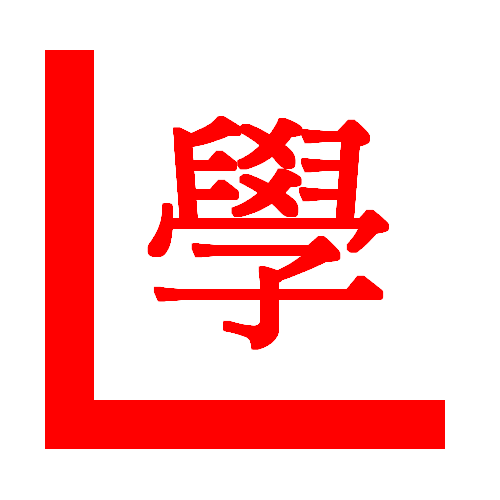
L-plate in Hong Kong, consisting the letter L and the traditional Chinese character 學 (meaning to learn)

L-plate used in Malaysia for other vehicles than motorcycles

An Australian L-plate

A New Zealand L-plate

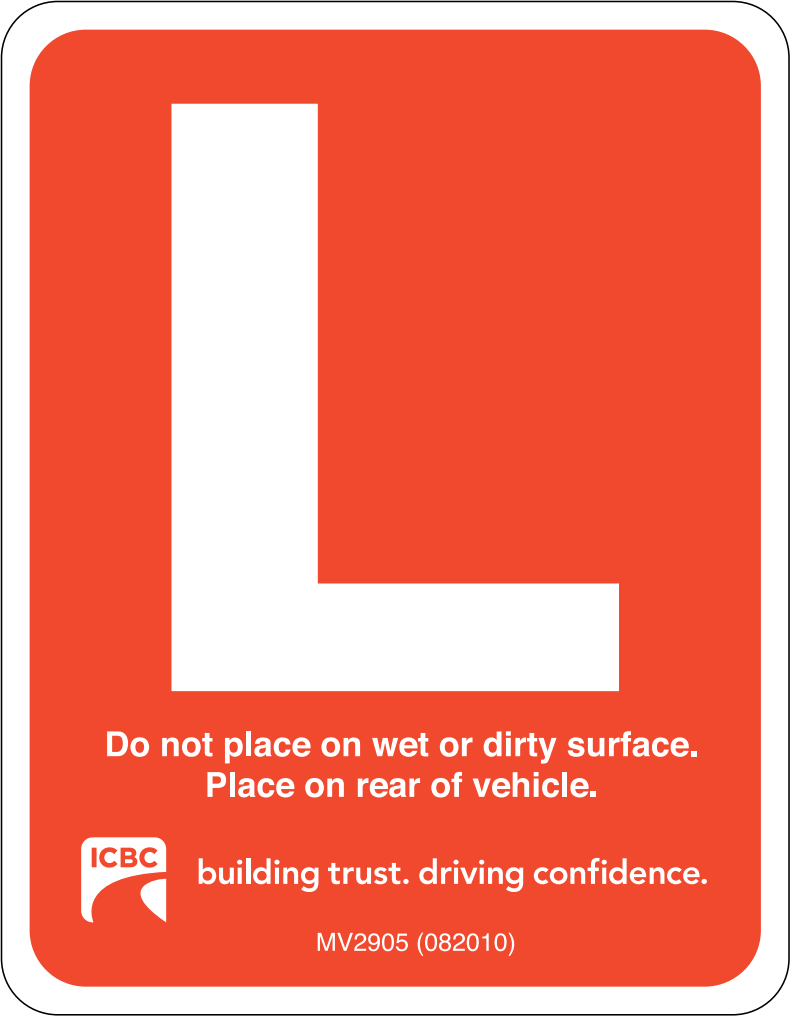
A British Columbian L-plate

An alternative Welsh D-plate

An Ireland N-plate

A Manx R-plate

A Northern Ireland R-plate

The P-plate (for probationary) which may optionally be used in the United Kingdom for newly qualified drivers

P-plate (for probationary) in Hong Kong, Australia (except Victoria and Western Australia) or Bosnia and Herzegovina (for početnik – beginner) for newly qualified drivers

Italian and Albanian P-plate (for principiante, meaning beginner)

Italian GA-plate (for guida accompagnata, meaning accompanied driving)

An Israeli L-plate

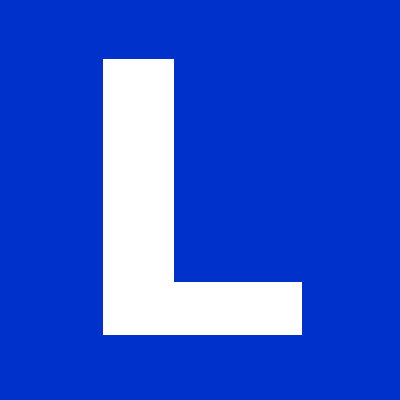
A Swiss, Belgian and Polish L-plate

A Spanish L-plate - for driving school

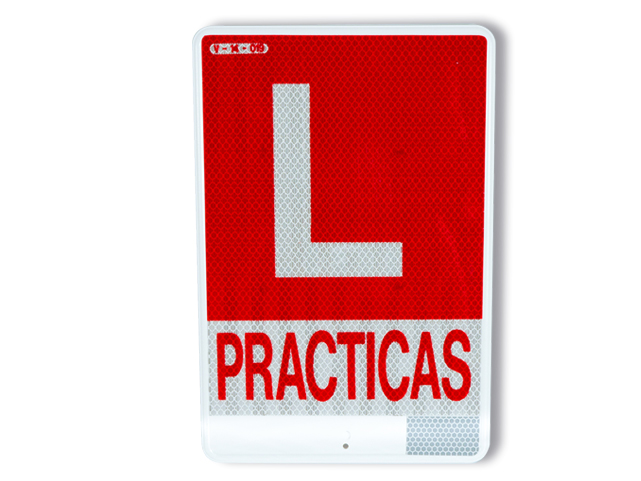
A Spanish L-plate - covered by an apprenticeship license. By the student's own methods without going to a driving school.

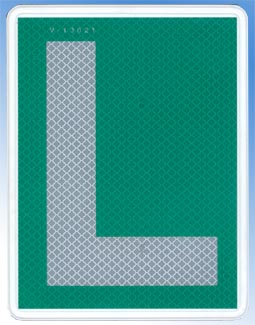
A Spanish new driver plate

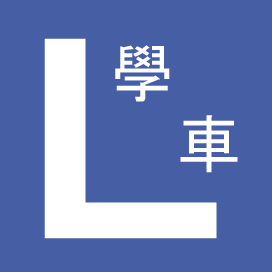
A Macanese L-plate

A Hungarian T-plate

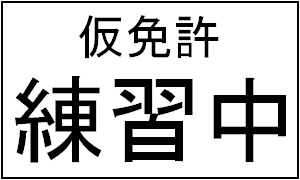
A Japanese L-plate for driving school cars

A Japanese shoshinsha mark (for new drivers)

A Japanese koreisha mark (for elderly drivers)

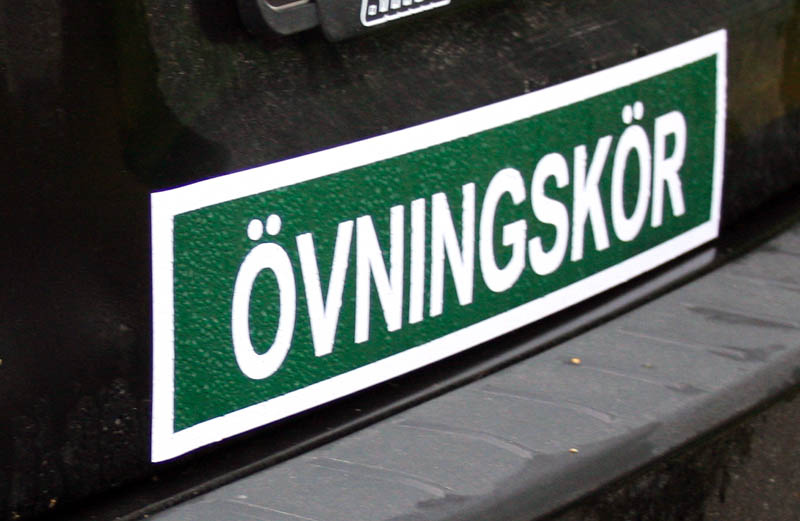
Swedish sign for learning driver

The zielony listek (green leaf) used in Poland for newly qualified drivers. However, it is not mandatory to display it.
