= Shoshinsha mark =

Japanese symbol for beginner drivers

Wakaba mark

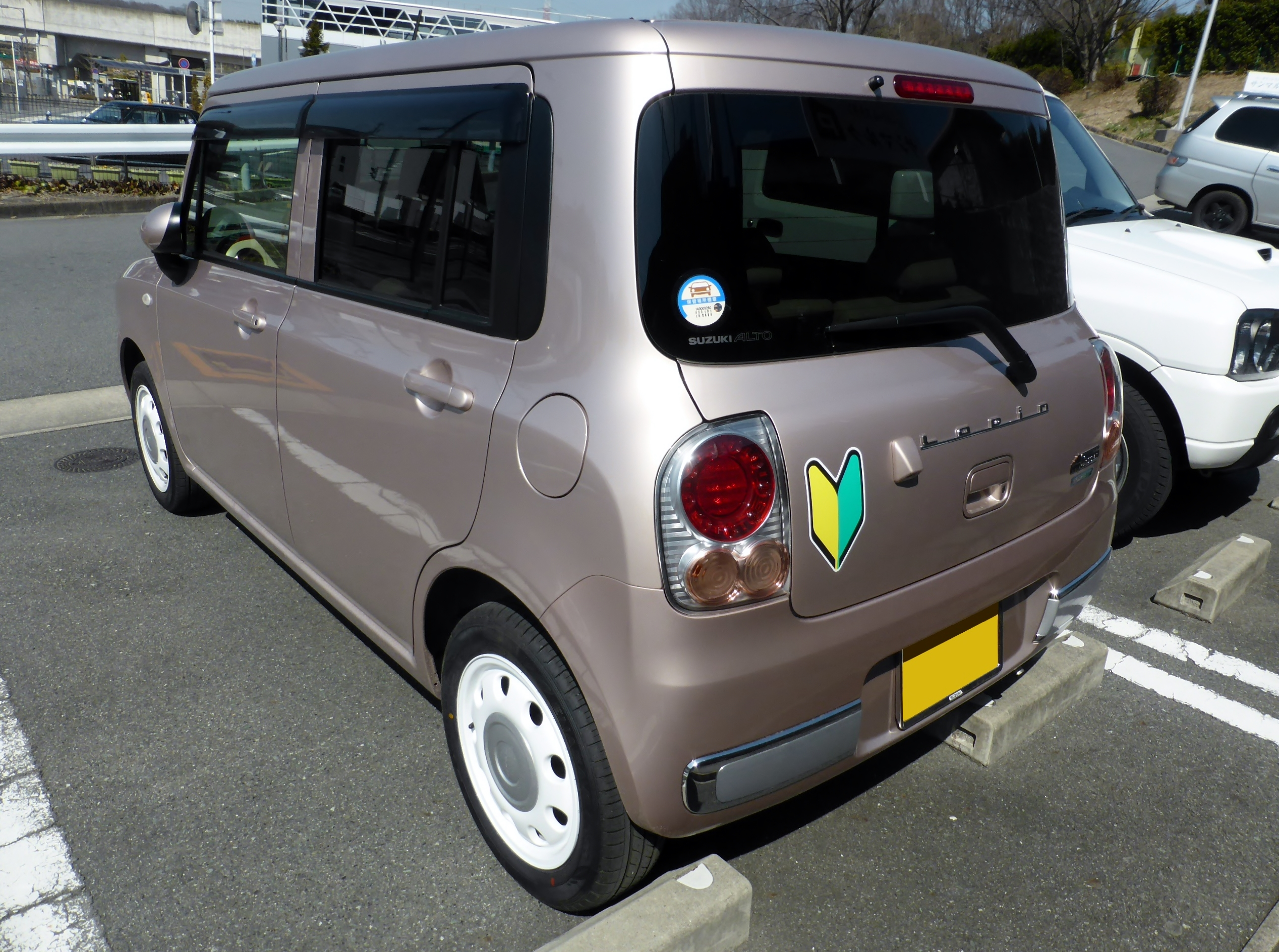
Shoshinsha mark displayed on a Suzuki Alto Lapin

The shoshinsha mark (初心者マーク, beginner's mark) or wakaba mark (若葉マーク, sprout mark), officially Beginner Drivers' Sign (初心運転者標識, Shoshin Untensha Hyōshiki), is a teal / green and yellow V-shaped symbol that beginner drivers in Japan must display at the designated places at the front and the rear of their cars for one year after they obtain a standard driver's license. Drivers who consider themselves beginners may continue to display the sign, even after the period of a year. Like the orange and yellow "fukushi mark" or "kōreisha mark" that denotes elderly drivers, the shoshinsha mark is designed to warn other drivers that the marked driver is not very skilled, either due to inexperience or old age.

In Japan the shoshinsha mark is also used beyond the driving context to indicate beginner status. In Tochigi, for example, new mothers are issued a card with the mark on it to indicate their experience level to health and child care support staff. New employees of companies may also have the mark on their name badges until they become more experienced. In video games, it is associated with tutorials and new players. In the anime Sgt. Frog, the character Tamama has a mirrored shoshinsha mark on his hat and stomach.

As of 2026, Georgists were using the symbol as an online identifier on Twitter.

The mark is represented in Unicode as U+1F530 (🔰), as part of the Miscellaneous Symbols and Pictographs block.

== See also ==
- Kōreisha mark (The mark for the elderly drivers)
- L-plates and P-plates
