= Spanish passport =

Passports issued to Spanish nationals

Spanish passport; Pasaporte español
- Front cover of a contemporary Spanish biometric passport (with chip)

- The data page of a contemporary Spanish biometric passport
- Type: Passport
- Issued by: National Police Corps; Guardia Civil; Spanish embassies and consulates
- First issued: 14 August 2006 (biometric passport); 2 January 2015 (current biometric version 3.0)
- Purpose: Identification
- Eligibility: Spanish citizenship
- Expiration: Spanish passports expire 5 years after issuance when borne by citizens up to the age of 30, and 10 years for citizens aged 30 and above
- Cost: €30.00

A Spanish passport (Spanish: pasaporte español) is an identity document issued to Spanish citizens with right of abode in the Iberian mainland, Ceuta, Melilla, Balearic Islands and Canary Islands, for travel outside Spain. Every Spanish citizen is also a citizen of the European Union. The passport, along with the national identity card, allows for free rights of movement and residence in any of the states of the European Union, European Economic Area, and Switzerland.

Spanish citizens have visa-free or visa-on-arrival access to 185 countries and territories, which places Spanish passport holders is in the 4th-ranking group in the world according to February 2026 Henley Passport Index.

== Types ==
- Ordinary Passport (Spanish: Pasaporte ordinario) – issued for ordinary travel, such as vacations and business trips
- Collective Passport (Spanish: Pasaporte colectivo) – issued for the occasion of pilgrimages, excursions and other acts of analogous nature, whenever reciprocity with the destination country exists; its validity is limited a single trip, whose duration will not be able to exceed three months.
- Diplomatic Passport (Spanish: Pasaporte diplomático) – issued to Spanish diplomats, top-ranking government officials, and diplomatic couriers.
- Official and Service Passports (Spanish: Pasaportes oficiales y de servicio) – issued to individuals representing the Spanish government on official business

== Visa requirements map ==
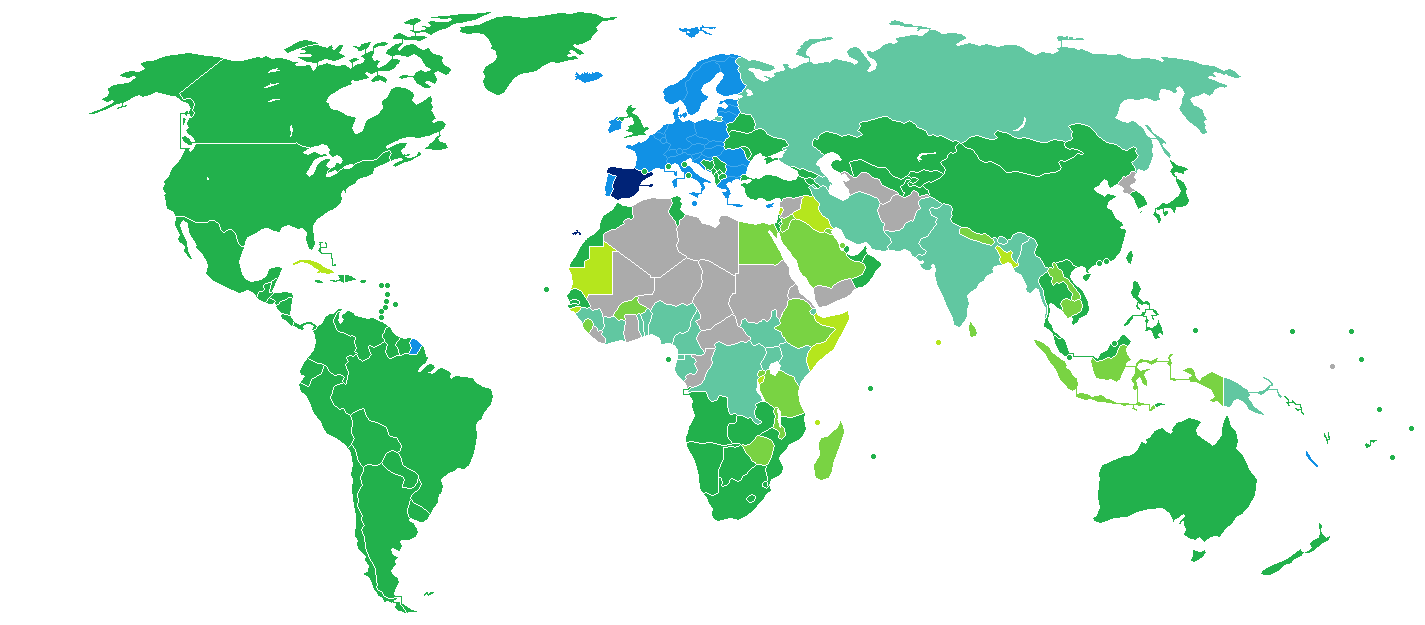
Visa requirements for Spanish citizens Spain Freedom of movement Visa not required / ESTA / eTA / eVisitor Visa on arrival eVisa Visa available both on arrival or online Visa required prior to arrival

As of 3 February 2026, Spanish passport holders had visa-free or visa-on-arrival access to 185 (compared to 192 as the most) countries and territories, placing the ordinary Spanish passport in the fourth ranking group according to the number of destinations that their holders can access without a prior visa.

Spanish citizens can live and work in any country within the EU due to the right of free movement and residence granted in Article 21 of the EU Treaty.

== Visa duration (in some countries) ==
=== Africa ===
- Botswana: 90 days
- Comoros (visa on arrival)
- Djibouti: 1 month (visa on arrival)
- Egypt: 1 month (visa on arrival, 25€)
- Ethiopia: 3 months (visa on arrival)
- Kenya: 3 months (visa on arrival)
- Lesotho: 14 days
- Madagascar: 3 months (visa on arrival)
- Malawi: 3 months
- Mauritius: 6 months
- Mayotte: unlimited access
- Morocco: 3 months
- Mozambique: 1 month (visa on arrival)
- Namibia: 3 months
- Réunion: unlimited access
- Saint Helena, Ascension and Tristan da Cunha: 90 days
- Senegal: 3 months
- Seychelles: 1 month
- South Africa: 3 months
- Eswatini (visa-free on arrival)
- Tanzania (visa on arrival)
- Togo: 7 days (visa on arrival)
- Tunisia: 4 months
- Uganda (visa on arrival)
- Zambia (visa on arrival)
- Zimbabwe: 3 months (visa on arrival)

=== Americas ===
- Anguilla: 3 months
- Antigua and Barbuda: 1 month
- Dutch Caribbean: 14 days
- Argentina: 3 months
- Aruba: 3 months
- The Bahamas: 3 months
- Barbados: 6 months
- Belize: 1 month
- Bermuda: 6 months
- Bolivia: 3 months
- Brazil: 3 months (hotel booking + return ticket)
- Canada: 6 months (previous authorization of eTA system)
- Cayman Islands: 1 month
- Chile: 3 months
- Colombia: 3 months
- Costa Rica: 3 months
- Dominica: 6 months
- Dominican Republic: 1 month (with tourist card of 10 US$)
- Ecuador: 3 months
- El Salvador: 3 months
- French Guiana: unlimited access
- Greenland: 3 months
- Grenada: 3 months
- Guadeloupe: unlimited access
- Guatemala: 3 months
- Guyana: 3 months
- Haiti: 3 months
- Honduras: 3 months
- Jamaica: 3 months
- Martinique: unlimited access
- Mexico: 6 months
- Montserrat: 3 months
- Nicaragua: 3 months
- Panama: 3 months
- Paraguay: 3 months
- Peru: 3 months
- Puerto Rico: 3 months (previous authorization of ESTA system) or 6 months (Visa required prior to arrival)
- Saint Kitts and Nevis: 3 months
- Saint Lucia: 28 days
- Saint Pierre and Miquelon: 3 months
- Saint Vincent and the Grenadines: 1 month
- Trinidad and Tobago: 3 months
- Turks and Caicos Islands: 1 month
- United States: 3 months (previous authorization of ESTA system) or 6 months (Visa required prior to arrival)
- Uruguay: 3 months
- Venezuela: 3 months
- British Virgin Islands: 1 month
- United States Virgin Islands: 3 months (previous authorization of ESTA system)

=== Asia ===
- Armenia: 90 days
- Azerbaijan: 30 days (visa on arrival)
- Bahrain: 90 days (visa on arrival €75)
- Bangladesh: 15 days (visa on arrival)
- Brunei: 90 days
- Cambodia: 1 month (visa on arrival US$30)
- China: 15 days ( Visa-free, taking effect from 1 December 2023 to November 2024)
- Hong Kong: 3 months
- Indonesia: 30 days (visa on arrival)
- Iran: 15 days (visa on arrival - only in international airports)
- Iraq: visa on arrival
- Israel: 3 months
- Japan: 90 days (extendable until 180 days)
- Jordan: 1 month (visa on arrival, 10JOD)
- Kuwait: 3 months (visa on arrival)
- Kyrgyzstan: 1 month (visa on arrival)
- Laos: 30 days (visa on arrival, US$35)
- Lebanon: 1 month (visa on arrival, 25000LL)
- Macau: 1 year
- Malaysia: 3 months
- Maldives: 30 days
- Nepal: 60 days (visa on arrival)
- Oman: 1 month (visa on arrival)
- Philippines: 30 days
- Qatar: 21 days (visa on arrival)
- South Korea: 3 months
- Singapore: 30 days
- Sri Lanka: 30 days
- Thailand: 30 days by air, 15 days by land/sea
- Taiwan: 90 days
- East Timor: 30 days (visa on arrival)
- United Arab Emirates: 30 days (visa on arrival)
- Vietnam: 45 days
- Yemen: 3 months (visa on arrival)

=== Europe ===
- Albania: 1 month
- Andorra:
- Belarus: 30 days
- Bosnia and Herzegovina: 90 days
- Faroe Islands: 90 days
- Georgia: 1 year
- Guernsey: 6 months
- Iceland: unlimited access
- Isle of Man: 6 months
- Jersey: 6 months
- Kazakhstan: 30 days
- Liechtenstein: unlimited access
- Moldova: 90 days
- Monaco: 90 days
- Montenegro: 90 days
- North Macedonia: 90 days
- Norway: unlimited access
- San Marino: 90 days
- Serbia: 90 days
- Switzerland: unlimited access
- Ukraine: 90 days
- Vatican City: 90 days
- United Kingdom: 6 months

=== Oceania ===
- American Samoa: 30 days
- Australia: e-visa (Electronic Travel Authority)
- Norfolk Island: e-visa (Electronic Travel Authority)
- Fiji: 4 months
- French Polynesia: 90 days
- Guam: 90 days
- Kiribati: 28 days
- Marshall Islands: 30 days (visa on arrival)
- Micronesia: 30 days
- New Caledonia: 90 days
- New Zealand: 3 months
- Northern Mariana Islands: 30 days
- Cook Islands: 31 days
- Niue: 30 days
- Palau: 30 days (visa on arrival)
- Papua New Guinea: 90 days (visa on arrival)
- Samoa: 60 days
- Solomon Islands: 3 months
- Tonga: 31 days
- Tuvalu: 1 month (visa on arrival)
- Vanuatu: 30 days
- Wallis and Futuna: 90 days

== Gallery ==
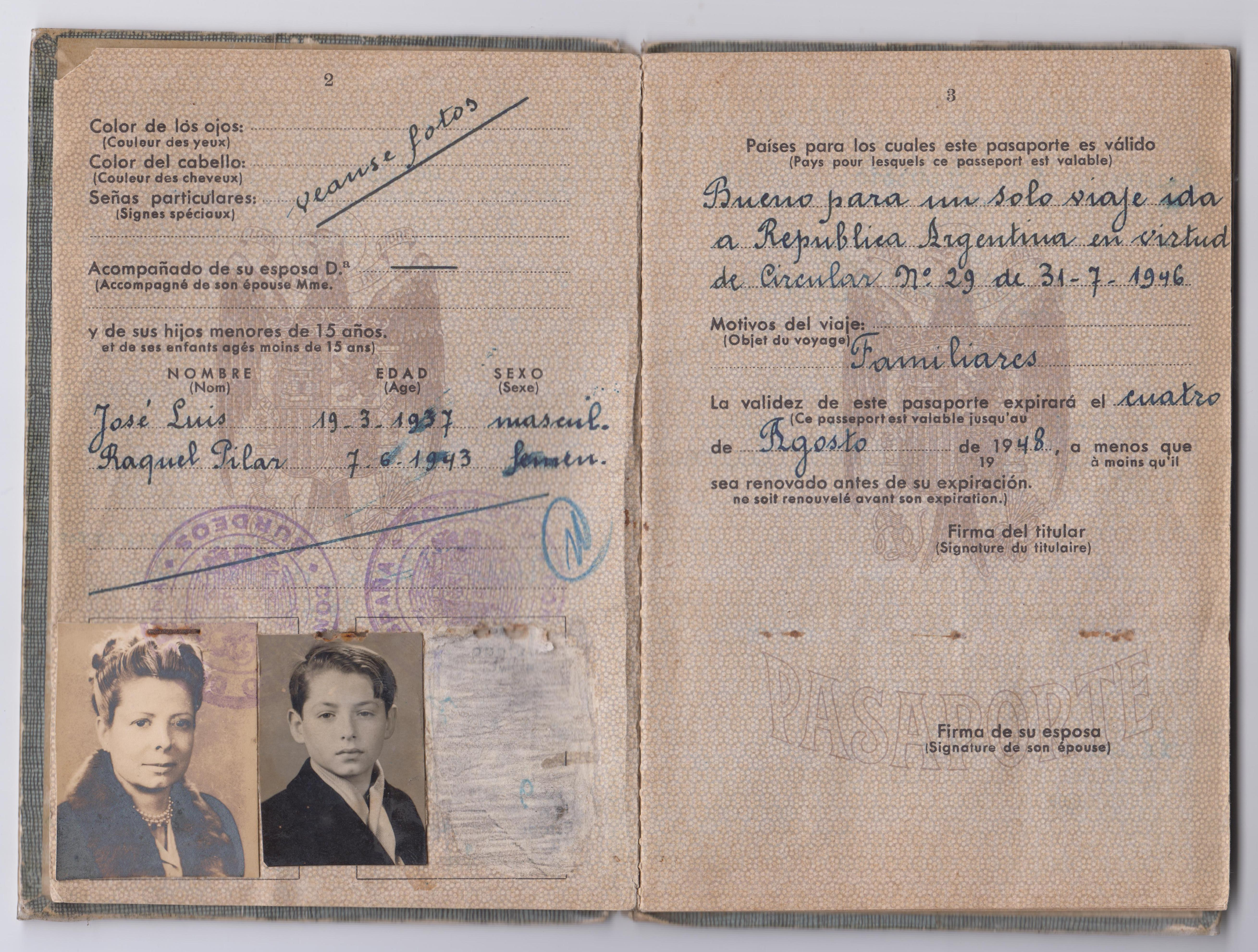
Passport issued to a Spanish republican in exile by the Spanish consulate in Bordeaux, France, in 1948.

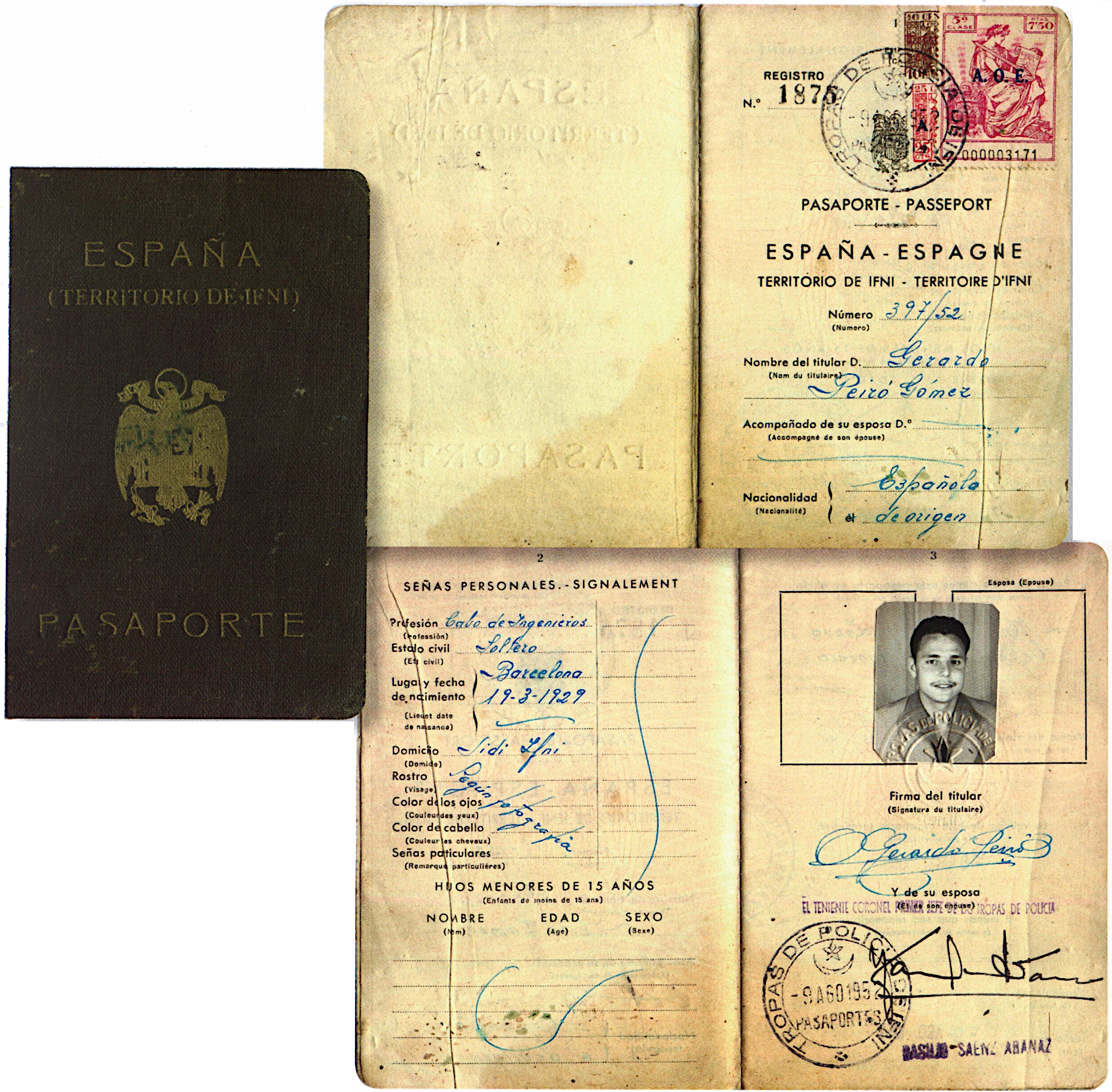
Passport issued to a Spanish resident in Ifni province, 1951

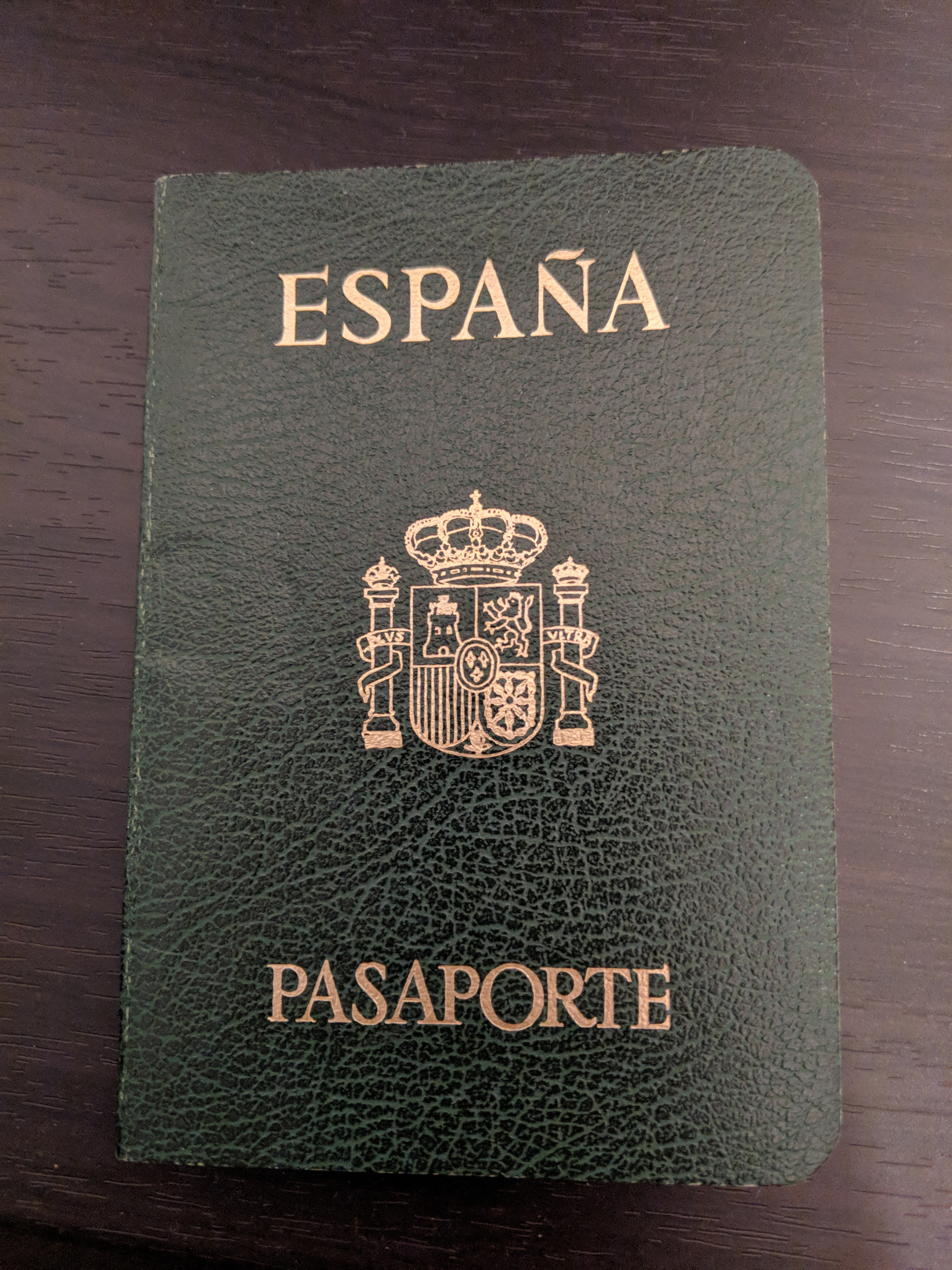
Leather "green cover" Spanish ordinary passport, issued in 1988

== See also ==
- Visa requirements for Spanish citizens
- Passports of the European Union
