= Kōreisha mark =

Japanese statutory mark for elderly drivers

Koreisha mark, from February 2011

The Kōreisha mark (高齢者マーク; elderly car mark) is a statutory sign that is set up in the Road Traffic Law of Japan to indicate "aged person at the wheel". Its official name is "aged driver sign" (高齢運転者標識, kōrei untensha hyōshiki).

The law states that when a person who is aged 70 and over, and if their old age could affect the driving, they are encouraged to display this mark on both the front and rear of the car. Drivers aged 75 and over are obliged to display the mark.

Conversely, the green and yellow shoshinsha mark (also called wakaba mark) denotes new drivers. Both marks are designed to warn other drivers that the marked driver is not very skilled, either due to inexperience or relative driving age categorisation.

== Description ==
Koreisha mark, 1997 – January 2011

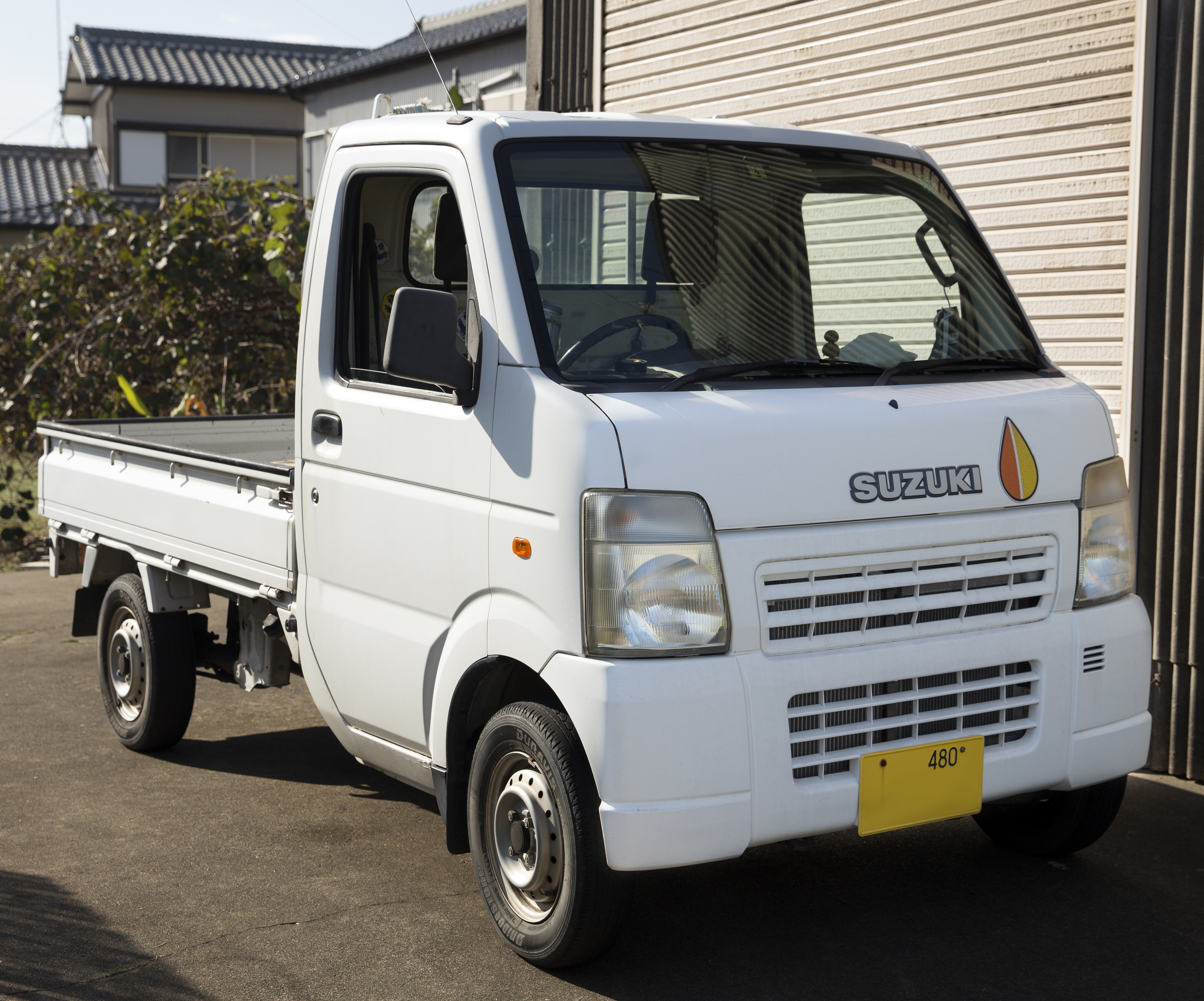
The old Koreisha mark on a truck

The system was instituted in 1997; until January 2011, its shape was an orange and yellow teardrop-shape, and it was accordingly also called "momiji mark" (紅葉マーク; autumn leaf mark). Some people call it "kareha mark" (枯れ葉マーク; dried leaf mark) or "Ochiba mark" (落葉マーク; fallen leaf mark), but this is a more informal title, and considered rude.

As of 1 February 2011, the shape was changed to the new, four-leafed form.

== Other uses ==
Outside Japan, owners of Japanese classic cars have adopted this symbol to indicate a love for older cars, rather than the driver's age. Japanese car enthusiasts overseas also use the Koreisha mark to indicate that they are an experienced driver as opposed to the Wakaba mark which indicates that they are new or a learner type driver; some members of the drifting community use the Wakaba stickers to hint at their risky driving style.

== See also ==
- L-plate
- Shoshinsha mark
