= Grunert =

Grunert is a surname of German origin, potentially derived from the Germanic surname Gruner. Notable people with the surname include:

- Carl Grunert (1865–1918), German writer
- George Grunert (1881–1971), United States Army cavalry officer
- Horst Grunert (1928–2005), East German diplomat
- Julius Theodor Grunert (1809–1889), German forester
- Kristopher Grunert (born 1978), Canadian photographer
- Leopoldo Sánchez Grunert (born 1949), Chilean politician
- Malte Grunert (born 1967), German film producer
- Martina Grunert (born 1949), German swimmer

== See also ==
- Grünert
- Gruner
- Gruener
