= Grüner =

Grüner may refer to:

- Grüner IL
- Grüner See (Styria)
- Grüner Veltliner, variety of white wine grape
- George Grüner (born 1943), Hungarian physicist
- Martin Grüner (1929-2018), German politician
- Grüner (restaurant), a restaurant in Portland, Oregon

== See also ==
- Gruner (disambiguation)
