= Visa requirements for Hungarian citizens =

Administrative entry restrictions

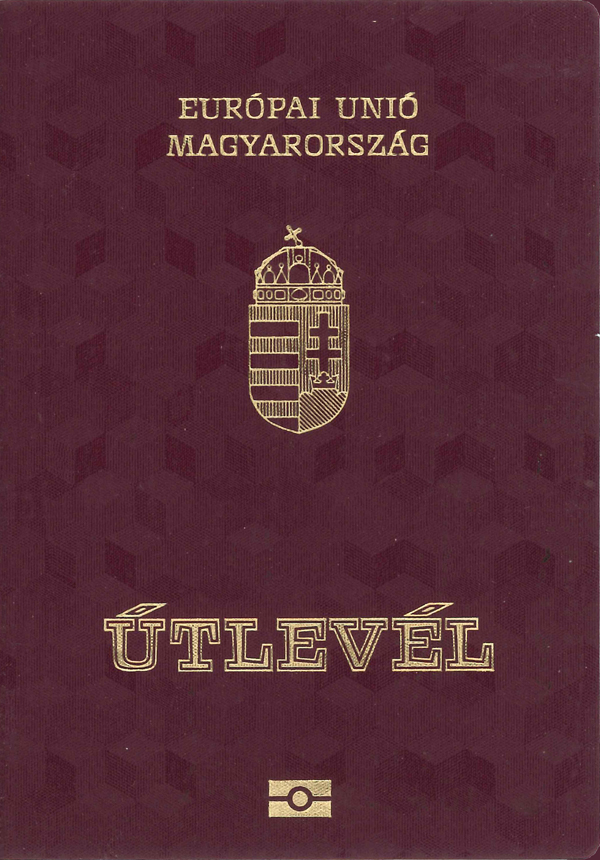
A Hungarian passport

Visa requirements for Hungarian citizens are administrative entry restrictions imposed on citizens of Hungary by the authorities of other states.

As of 2026, holders of a Hungarian passport may travel to 183 countries and territories without a travel visa, or with a visa on arrival. The Hungarian passport passport ranks (Note: Using dense ranking.) 6th in terms of travel freedom, according to the Henley Passport Index. It is also ranked 5th by the Global Passport Power Rank.

== Historical perspective ==
Travel restrictions have been considerably relaxed since the end of communism and the removal of Hungary's border fence with Austria in May 1989.

During the communist era, travelling to the West was a long and difficult process for Hungarian citizens. The first step was to obtain an invitation, preferably from a relative in the country to be visited, and a promise of full financial support. With such an invitation, and assuming a passport could be obtained, a Hungarian could travel westwards once a year. However, in the absence of such an invitation, travel to the West was possible only once every three years. The Communist-era visa restrictions restricted Hungarian artists and musicians since it hindered their ability to travel abroad. As a result, many chose to leave Hungary and settle in the West, such as famed cellist János Starker, who emigrated to the United States in 1948 because it was impossible for him to tour abroad with a Hungarian passport.

Domestic events in Hungary have affected the visa requirements imposed on Hungarian citizens by Western countries. The Revolution of 1956 and the ensuing domestic repression resulted in the United States deciding to expedite all Hungarian visa requests.

The end of communism in 1989 led to a rapid relaxation of visa restrictions. Visa-free travel for Hungarians was introduced by several countries, including Sweden in 1986, the United Kingdom in 1990, Germany in 1990, France (1990), Spain in 1990, Belgium in 1991, South Korea in 1991 and Chile in 1992. 1993 saw Israel, South Africa, Portugal and Tunisia abolish the requirement for ordinary Hungarian tourists to obtain visas in advance of departure. Canada and Slovakia followed in 1994. Italy waived prior visas in 1995, Mexico in 1997, Austria in 1997, Japan (1997), Slovenia (1998), Panama (1998), Morocco (1999). New Zealand scrapped requirements for visas in 2000 followed by Croatia that same year, and Brazil in 2001, Hong Kong in 2002, Serbia in 2003, Ukraine in 2003 and Peru later that same year of 2003.

Despite the tremendous increase in the number of visa waiver agreements, there have also been setbacks. In June 2001, the visa-free travel agreement between Hungary and Russia came to an end, and both countries now require visas of one another's citizens.

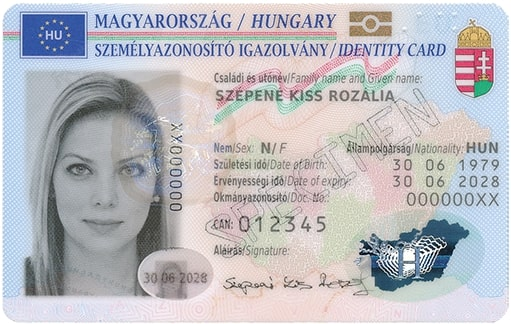
A Hungarian identity card is valid for travel to most European countries

Hungary's accession to the European Union on 1 May 2004, along with its fellow V4 companions, radically boosted reciprocal visa-free arrangements.

Hungarians can now not only travel visa-free to any member state of the EU, but also have a right to settle there. A valid Hungarian passport or identity card is sufficient for any stay shorter than three months. For periods longer than three months, a residence permit is needed. Hungarians are allowed to settle in any EU country for more than three months if they work or study there, or if they are financially self-sufficient. By virtue of the agreement on the European Economic Area (EEA), those rights also apply to Hungarians in Iceland, Norway and Liechtenstein. The same rights also extend to Hungarians in Switzerland as a result of the Agreement on the Free Movement of Persons. Following the accession to the European Union in 2004 and the Schengen Area in 2007, visa requirements were also lifted by several other countries including Georgia (2005), Bosnia and Herzegovina (2005), North Macedonia (2005), Colombia (2005), Moldova (2007), Botswana (2008), Taiwan (2008), and Thailand (2011).

The Hungarian government's decade-long efforts to have U.S. visa requirements abolished for Hungarian citizens finally came to fruition on 17 November 2008 when the United States decided to include Hungary in its Visa Waiver Program. The inclusion of Hungary in the Visa Waiver Program was considered a major event there. Kinga Göncz, the country's then foreign minister, even went as far as to describe it as "a landmark in our relations [with the United States], since the visa waiver was essentially the single unresolved issue." However, Hungarian President László Sólyom, who had promised upon his election in 2005 never to visit the United States as long as fingerprint requirements were part of U.S. visa procedures, refused to sign the agreement on the U.S. Visa Waiver Program, fearing it would give the United States too much access to Hungary's criminal registry. His refusal did not affect Hungary's inclusion in the program.

Visa requirements for Hungarian citizens were lifted by Qatar (July 2012), Kyrgyzstan (July 2012), Armenia (January 2013), Jamaica (March 2013), Turkey (February 2014), Papua New Guinea (March 2014), Bahrain (October 2014), the United Arab Emirates (May 2015), Timor-Leste (May 2015), Samoa (May 2015), Indonesia (June 2015), Kazakhstan (July 2015), São Tomé and Príncipe (August 2015), Tonga (November 2015), Palau (December 2015), Marshall Islands (June 2016), Tuvalu (July 2016), Solomon Islands (October 2016), Belarus (February 2017), Cape Verde (1 January 2019), Uzbekistan (1 February 2019), Oman (December 2020), Tajikistan (January 2022), Mongolia (January 2023), Angola (September 2023) and China (March 2024).

Hungarian citizens were made eligible for eVisas by Guinea and Malawi (October 2019), Saudi Arabia (September 2019), Suriname and Pakistan (April 2019), Tanzania and Papua New Guinea (November 2018), Ethiopia (1 June 2018), Djibouti (February 2018), Egypt (December 2017), Azerbaijan (January 2017), India (August 2015) and Myanmar (October 2014).

The number of visa-free destinations for Hungarian citizens grew rapidly over the last few years, in 2009 Hungarian citizens could travel to 131 countries without a visa, to 142 in 2010, 153 in 2012 and 182 in 2020.

== Visa requirements map ==
Visa requirements for Hungarian citizens using normal passports Hungary - Right of abode Freedom of movement Visa not required / ETA (Note: ETA required for Canada if arriving by air, Kenya, Israel, New Zealand, Saint Kitts and Nevis, Seychelles, United Kingdom and the United States and its territories) (Note: Including Australian eVisitor.) Visa on arrival eVisa Visa available both on arrival or online (Note: Including Indonesian e-VOA) Visa required prior to arrival

== Visa requirements ==
Country	Visa requirement	Allowed stay	Notes (excluding departure fees)
Afghanistan	eVisa	30 days	A visa is not required for individuals born in Afghanistan or for those who can provide proof that one of their parents is an Afghan national or was born in Afghanistan.; e-Visa : Visitors must arrive at Kabul International (KBL).
Albania	Visa not required	90 days	ID card valid.
Algeria	Visa required		Persons may be denied entry if entering with a passport containing visas or stamps issued by Israel.; Visitors on tours organized to some southern regions by an approved travel agency may obtain a visa on arrival for up to 30 days.
Andorra	Visa not required	90 days	ID card valid.
Angola	Visa not required	30 days	30 days per trip, but no more than 90 days within any 1 calendar year for tourism purposes only.; Visitors must have a return/onward ticket and a hotel reservation confirmation.; An International Certificate of Vaccination is required.
Antigua and Barbuda	Visa not required	6 months	
Argentina	Visa not required	90 days	
Armenia	Visa not required	180 days	
Australia	eVisitor	90 days	90 days on each visit in 12-month period if granted.; eVisitor is issued free of charge.; May enter using SmartGate.
Austria	Visa not required	Freedom of movement; ID card valid	
Azerbaijan	eVisa	30 days	
Bahamas	Visa not required	3 months	
Bahrain	eVisa / Visa on arrival	14 days	
Bangladesh	Visa on arrival	30 days	Not available at all entry points.
Barbados	Visa not required	3 months	
Belarus	Visa not required	30 days	Visa-free until 31 December 2026.
Belgium	Visa not required	Freedom of movement; ID card valid	
Belize	Visa not required		
Benin	eVisa	30 days	Must have an international vaccination certificate.; Three types of electronic visa are offered: the e-Visa valid for 30 days for a single entry (50 EUR), the e-Visa valid for 30 days for several (multiple) entries (75 EUR), and the e-Visa valid for 90 days to make several (multiple) entries (100 EUR).
Bhutan	eVisa		The Sustainable Development Fee (SDF) of 200 USD per person, per night for almost all visitors to Bhutan. Additionally, if payment is made in US dollars from September 1, 2023 to August 31, 2027, the SDF is 100 USD.
Bolivia	Visa not required	90 days	
Bosnia and Herzegovina	Visa not required	90 days	90 days within any 6-month period.; ID card valid.
Botswana	Visa not required	90 days	90 days within any year period.
Brazil	Visa not required	90 days	90 days within any 180 day period.
Brunei	Visa not required	90 days	
Bulgaria	Visa not required	Freedom of movement; ID card valid	
Burkina Faso	eVisa	90 days	International Certificate of Vaccination or Prophylaxis required.
Burundi	eVisa / Visa on arrival	1 month	
Cambodia	eVisa / Visa on arrival	30 days	Visa is also obtainable online.
Cameroon	eVisa		
Canada	eTA / Visa not required	6 months	eTA required if arriving by air.
Cape Verde	Visa not required	30 days	Must register online at least five days prior to arrival.
Central African Republic	Visa required		
Chad	eVisa	90 days	
Chile	Visa not required	90 days	
China	Visa not required	30 days	Visa-free from 14 March 2024 to 31 December 2026.
Colombia	Visa not required	90 days	90 days – extendable up to 180-days stay within a one-year period.
Comoros	Visa on arrival	45 days	
Republic of the Congo	Visa required		
Democratic Republic of the Congo	eVisa	7 days	
Costa Rica	Visa not required	180 days	
Côte d'Ivoire	eVisa	3 months	e-Visa holders must arrive via Port Bouet Airport.
Croatia	Visa not required	Freedom of movement; ID card valid	
Cuba	eVisa	90 days	Can be extended up to 90 days with a fee.
Cyprus	Visa not required	Freedom of movement; ID card valid	
Czech Republic	Visa not required	Freedom of movement; ID card valid	
Denmark	Visa not required	Freedom of movement (DK); ID card valid	
Djibouti	eVisa / Visa on arrival	30 days	
Dominica	Visa not required	90 days	90 days within any 180 day period.
Dominican Republic	Visa not required	90 days	can be extended up to 120 days
Ecuador	Visa not required	90 days	
Egypt	eVisa / Visa on arrival	30 days	Visa required, except for a max. stay of 15 days for holders of normal passports, traveling as tourists and arriving at Sharm El Sheik (SSH), Saint Catherine (SKV) or Taba (TCP) airports and remaining in the Sinai resorts.
El Salvador	Visa not required	180 days	
Equatorial Guinea	eVisa		must arrive via Malabo International Airport, processing fee 75 USD
Eritrea	Visa required		
Estonia	Visa not required	Freedom of movement; ID card valid	
Eswatini	Visa not required	30 days	
Ethiopia	eVisa / Visa on arrival	up to 90 days	e-Visa holders must arrive via Addis Ababa Bole International Airport
Fiji	Visa not required	4 months	
Finland	Visa not required	Freedom of movement; ID card valid	
France	Visa not required	Freedom of movement (in Regions of France); ID card valid	
Gabon	eVisa	90 days	e-Visa holders must arrive via Libreville International Airport.
Gambia	Visa not required	90 days	
Georgia	Visa not required	1 year	ID card valid
Germany	Visa not required	Freedom of movement; ID card valid	
Ghana	Visa required		
Greece	Visa not required	Freedom of movement; ID card valid	
Grenada	Visa not required	3 months	
Guatemala	Visa not required	90 days	
Guinea	eVisa	90 days	
Guinea-Bissau	Visa on arrival	90 days	
Guyana	eVisa		An eVisa(Approval letter) can only be obtained after contacting the Department of Immigration and Citizenship by phone.; Payment is done upon arrival.
Haiti	Visa not required	90 days	
Honduras	Visa not required	90 days	
Iceland	Visa not required	Freedom of movement; ID card valid	
India	eVisa	30 days	e-Visa holders must arrive via 32 designated airports (Note: Ahmedabad; Amritsar; Bagdogra; Bengaluru; Bhubaneswar; Chandigarh; Chennai; Coimbatore; Delhi; Gaya; Goa-Dabolim; Goa-Manohar; Guwahati; Hyderabad; Indore; Jaipur; Kannur; Kochi; Kolkata; Kozhikode; Lucknow; Madurai; Mangaluru; Mumbai; Nagpur; Port Blair; Pune; Surat; Thiruvananthapuram; Tiruchirappalli; Varanasi; Visakhapatnam) or 5 designated seaports. (Note: Chennai; Cochin; Mormugao (Goa); Mumbai; Mangalore); An Indian e-Tourist Visa may only be obtained twice within 1 calendar year.; Foreigners of Pakistani origin or who hold a Pakistani Passport are not eligible for an e-Visa. Foreigners who are not Pakistani nationals, but whose parents or grandparents (either paternal or maternal) were born in, or were permanent residents in Pakistan, are also not eligible for an e-Visa.
Indonesia	e-VOA / Visa on arrival	30 days	
Iran	eVisa	30 days	
Iraq	eVisa	60 days	Visa on arrival or eVisa for up to 30 days for travel to Iraqi Kurdistan.; Authorities in Iraq have decided to remove the visa-on-arrival requirement for nationals of the European Union and several other countries, requiring them to now apply for an e-visa to enter Iraq through the official platform.
Ireland	Visa not required	Freedom of movement; ID card valid	
Israel	ETA-IL	90 days	Starting 1st January 2025, an ETA is required
Italy	Visa not required	Freedom of movement; ID card valid	
Jamaica	Visa not required	30 days	
Japan	Visa not required	90 days	
Jordan	eVisa / Visa on arrival	30 days	fee 40 USD. Extension of stay is possible for up to 60 days
Kazakhstan	Visa not required	30 days	
Kenya	Electronic Travel Authorisation	90 days	Applications can be submitted up to 90 days prior to travel and must be submitted at least 3 days in advance.; eTA fee is 32.50 USD.; Proof of reservation at the hotel where visitors plan to stay is required (if staying with friends, an invitation letter is also acceptable).; Yellow fever vaccination certificate is required if coming from endemic countries.
Kiribati	Visa not required	90 days	90 days within any 180 day period.
North Korea	Visa required		
South Korea	Visa not required	90 days	K-ETA exemption until the end of 2026.; The validity period of a K-ETA is 3 years from the date of approval.
Kuwait	eVisa / Visa on arrival	3 months	
Kyrgyzstan	Visa not required	60 days	
Laos	eVisa / Visa on arrival	30 days	18 (Note: Savannakhet Airport; Lanetoui - Mengkang (China); Meuangmom - Wan Pong (Myanmar); Banvang - Ban Khok Phai (Thailand); Namngeun - Huay Kon (Thailand); Paksan - Bueng Kan (Thailand); Paktaphan - Pak Saeng (Thailand); Pangmon - Ban Huak (Thailand); Phoudou (Thailand); Dak ta ock - Nam Giang (Vietnam); La Lai (Vietnam); Namkan (Vietnam); Namphao - Cau Treo (Vietnam); Namsoy - Na Meo (Vietnam); Naphao - Cha Lo (Vietnam); Pahang - Long Sap (Vietnam); Panghok - Tây Trang (Vietnam); Phoukeua - Bo Y (Vietnam)) of the 33 border crossings are only open to regular visa holders.; e-Visa may be used to enter Laos through the Luang Prabang, Pakse and Vientiane international airports, 3 Thai-Lao Friendship Bridges (Note: Vientiane (Friendship Bridge 1); Savannakhet (Friendship Bridge 2); Bokeo (Friendship Bridge 4)), in Boten (road and railroad), and in Vientiane (at Khamsavath railway station).; Visa on arrival is available at the Luang Prabang, Pakse and Vientiane international airports, 4 Thai-Lao Friendship Bridges (Note: Vientiane (Friendship Bridge 1); Savannakhet (Friendship Bridge 2); Khammouane (Friendship Bridge 3); Bokeo (Friendship Bridge 4)) and 7 border crossings. (Note: Nongnokkheane - Trapeang Kriel (Cambodia); Boten - Bo han (China); Golden Triangle/Samliemkham (Thailand); Khamsavath railway station (Thailand); Namheuang - Ban Na Kraseng (Thailand); Vang tao - Chongmek (Thailand); Dansavan - Lao Bảo (Vietnam))
Latvia	Visa not required	Freedom of movement.; ID card valid.	
Lebanon	Visa on arrival	1 month	Extendable for 2 additional months; Granted free of charge at Beirut International Airport or any other port of entry if there is no Israeli visa or seal, holding a telephone number, an address in Lebanon, and a non refundable return or circle trip ticket.
Lesotho	Visa not required	14 days	
Liberia	eVisa	90 days	The Liberia Visa on Arrival (VoA) allows travelers to obtain a Visa upon arrival in Liberia by plane. Travelers must pre-apply for the visa online.
Libya	eVisa	30 days	Independent travel is not permitted, and visitors must organize their visit through a tour guide. A tourist police escort is required at all times.; An eVisa will not be granted without a sponsor or tour agency.; A security letter issued by the Libyan Immigration Authorities may also be required.; Holders of passports containing an Israeli stamp or visa will be refused entry in Libya.
Liechtenstein	Visa not required	Freedom of movement.; ID card valid.	
Lithuania	Visa not required	Freedom of movement.; ID card valid.	
Luxembourg	Visa not required	Freedom of movement.; ID card valid.	
Madagascar	eVisa / Visa on arrival	60 days	
Malawi	eVisa / Visa on arrival	90 days	
Malaysia	Visa not required	90 days	The electronic Malaysia Digital Arrival Card must be submitted within three days before the date of arrival in Malaysia.
Maldives	Visa on arrival	30 days	
Mali	Visa required		
Malta	Visa not required	Freedom of movement.; ID card valid.	
Marshall Islands	Visa not required	90 days	90 days within any 180 day period.
Mauritania	eVisa	30 days	An eVisa is mandatory before travel.
Mauritius	Visa not required	180 days	180 days per calendar year for tourism, 120 days per calendar year for business
Mexico	Visa not required	180 days	
Micronesia	Visa not required	90 days	90 days within any 180 day period.
Moldova	Visa not required	90 days	90 days within any 180 day period; ID card valid
Monaco	Visa not required		ID card valid.
Mongolia	Visa not required	30 days	The Ministry of Foreign Affairs of Mongolia has exempted visas for 34 countries from January 2023 to December 2026.
Montenegro	Visa not required	90 days	ID card valid for 30 days.
Morocco	Visa not required	90 days	
Mozambique	eVisa / Visa on arrival	30 days	
Myanmar	eVisa	28 days	e-Visa holders must arrive via Yangon, Nay Pyi Taw or Mandalay airports or via land border crossings with Thailand — Tachileik, Myawaddy and Kawthaung or India — Rih Khaw Dar and Tamu.; e-Visa available for both tourism (allowed stay is 28 days) or business (allowed stay is 70 days) purposes.
Namibia	eVisa / Visa on arrival	3 months	
Nauru	Visa required		
Nepal	eVisa / Visa on arrival	90 days	Not available at all entry points.
Netherlands	Visa not required	Freedom of movement; ID card valid	
New Zealand	NZeTA	3 months	International Visitor Conservation and Tourism Levy must be paid upon requesting an Electronic Travel Authority.; Holders of an Australian Permanent Resident Visa or Resident Return Visa may be granted a New Zealand Resident Visa on arrival permitting indefinite stay (pursuant to the Trans-Tasman Travel Arrangement), subject to meeting character requirements and obtaining an Electronic Travel Authority prior to departure. Such travellers are not required to pay the International Visitor Conservation and Tourism Levy.
Nicaragua	Visa not required	90 days	All visitors are required to obtain a Tourist Card on arrival.
Niger	Visa required		
Nigeria	eVisa	90 days	
North Macedonia	Visa not required	90 days	ID card valid.
Norway	Visa not required	Freedom of movement; ID card valid	
Oman	Visa not required	14 days	An eVisa valid for 30 days is also available.; Must present proof of a confirmed hotel reservation, health insurance, and a return ticket.
Pakistan	eVisa	90 days	Online Visa eligible.; Issued in 7-10 business days.
Palau	Visa not required	90 days	90 days within any 180 day period.
Panama	Visa not required	90 days	
Papua New Guinea	eVisa	60 days	Available at Gurney Airport (Alotau), Mount Hagen Airport, Port Moresby Airport and Tokua Airport (Rabaul).
Paraguay	Visa not required	90 days	
Peru	Visa not required	90 days	90 days within any 6-month period.
Philippines	Visa not required	30 days	
Poland	Visa not required	Freedom of movement; ID card valid	
Portugal	Visa not required	Freedom of movement; ID card valid	
Qatar	Visa not required	90 days	
Romania	Visa not required	Freedom of movement; ID card valid	
Russia	eVisa	30 days	e-Visa holders must arrive and departure via 29 checkpoints
Rwanda	eVisa / Visa on arrival	30 days	
Saint Kitts and Nevis	ETA	3 months	All travelers must apply for an ETA online.
Saint Lucia	Visa not required	90 days	90 days within any 180 day period.
Saint Vincent and the Grenadines	Visa not required	90 days	90 days within any 180 day period.
Samoa	Visa not required	90 days	90 days within any 180 day period.
San Marino	Visa not required		ID card valid.
São Tomé and Príncipe	Visa not required	15 days	
Saudi Arabia	eVisa / Visa on arrival	90 days	
Senegal	Visa not required	90 days	
Serbia	Visa not required	90 days	90 days within any 6-month period.; ID card valid.
Seychelles	ETA	3 months	Travelers must obtain an ETA before departure.
Sierra Leone	eVisa / Visa on arrival	3 months / 30 days	
Singapore	Visa not required	90 days	
Slovakia	Visa not required	Freedom of movement.; ID card valid.	
Slovenia	Visa not required	Freedom of movement.; ID card valid.	
Solomon Islands	Visa not required	90 days	90 days within any 180 day period.
Somalia	eVisa	30 days	All visitors must have an approved Electronic Visa (eTAS) before the start of their journey.
South Africa	Visa not required	90 days	
South Sudan	eVisa	6 months	Obtainable online 30 days single entry for 100 USD, 90 days multiple entry for 200 USD and 180 days multiple entry for 350 USD.; Printed visa authorization must be presented at the time of travel.
Spain	Visa not required	Freedom of movement.; ID card valid.	
Sri Lanka	ETA / Visa on arrival	30 days	Sri Lanka introduced an ETA valid for 30 days.
Sudan	Visa required		
Suriname	Visa not required	90 days	An entrance fee of USD 50 or EUR 50 must be paid online prior to arrival.; Multiple entry e-Visa is also available.
Sweden	Visa not required	Freedom of movement.; ID card valid.	
Switzerland	Visa not required	Freedom of movement.; ID card valid.	
Syria	eVisa / Visa on arrival	30 days	
Tajikistan	Visa not required	30 days	60 days eVisa also available .; e-Visa holders can enter through all border points.
Tanzania	eVisa / Visa on arrival	90 days	
Thailand	Visa not required	60 days	Can be extended for an additional 30 days
Timor-Leste	Visa not required	90 days	90 days within any 180 day period.
Togo	eVisa	15 days	
Tonga	Visa not required	90 days	90 days within any 180 day period.
Trinidad and Tobago	Visa not required	90 days	90 days within any 180 day period.
Tunisia	Visa not required	3 months	
Turkey	Visa not required	90 days	90 days within any 6-month period.; ID card valid.
Turkmenistan	Visa required		10-day visa on arrival if holding a letter of invitation provided by a company registered in Turkmenistan with a prior approval from the Foreign Ministry. Visitors can apply to extend their stay for an additional 10 days.; When transiting between two non-bordering countries, visitors can obtain a Turkmenistan transit visa for a five-day stay. This must be applied for in advance at the Turkmenistan Embassy. Visitors must also submit copies of the visas for the country of entry into Turkmenistan and the country of departure from Turkmenistan. Visa fee is 20 USD.
Tuvalu	Visa not required	90 days	90 days within any 180 day period.
Uganda	eVisa	3 months	Determined at the port of entry.
Ukraine	Visa not required	90 days	90 days within any 180 day period.
United Arab Emirates	Visa not required	90 days	90 days within any 180 day period.
United Kingdom	ETA UK	6 months	ETA UK (valid for 2 years when issued) required from 2 April 2025.; Adults can use ePassport gates.
United States	Visa Waiver Program	90 days	Hungary's status in the Visa Waiver Program has been restored.; ESTA is valid for 2 years from the date of issuance.; ESTA is also required when entering the country by cruise ship or land.; A Form I-94 is required for entry into the United States by land. It carries a $30 fee and can be obtained either online or upon arrival.; Visa required for nationals of VWP countries who have travelled or been present in Iran, Iraq, Libya, North Korea, Somalia, Sudan, Syria or Yemen at any time on or after 1 March 2011 or Cuba at any time on or after 12 January 2021, or nationals of VWP countries who are also nationals of Iran, Iraq, North Korea, Sudan or Syria. Exceptions apply if the travel was in military or diplomatic service of the VWP country.
Uruguay	Visa not required	90 days	
Uzbekistan	Visa not required	30 days	
Vanuatu	Visa not required	90 days	90 days within any 180 day period.
Vatican City	Visa not required		ID card valid.
Venezuela	Visa not required	90 days	
Vietnam	Visa not required	45 days	Temporary visa-free regime from 15 August 2025 until 14 August 2028 when travelling for tourism.; eVisa valid for 90 days is also available.
Yemen	Visa required		Yemen introduced an e-Visa system for visitors who meet certain eligibility requirements (group travel of 10 or more people, business trips, and transit etc.).
Zambia	Visa not required	30 days	Also eligible for a universal visa allowing access to Zimbabwe.
Zimbabwe	eVisa / Visa on arrival	30 days	Strictly tourism purposes only.; Also eligible for a universal visa allowing access to Zambia.

== Disputed areas, partially recognized countries and restricted zones ==
Visa requirements for Hungarian citizens for visits to various territories, disputed areas, partially recognized countries and restricted zones:

Visitor to	Visa requirement	Notes (excluding departure fees)
Europe
Abkhazia	Visa required	
Mount Athos	Special permit required	Special permit required (4 days: 25 euro for Orthodox visitors, 35 euro for non-Orthodox visitors, 18 euro for students). There is a visitors' quota: maximum 100 Orthodox and 10 non-Orthodox per day and women are not allowed.
(Belarus) Brest and Grodno	Visa not required	Visa-free for 10 days
Northern Cyprus	Visa not required	3 months: ID card valid
(United Nations) UN Buffer Zone in Cyprus	Access Permit required	Access Permit is required for travelling inside the zone, except Civil Use Areas.
Faroe Islands	Visa not required	ID card valid
Gibraltar	Visa not required	ID card valid
Guernsey	Visa not required	
Isle of Man	Visa not required	
(Norway) Jan Mayen	Permit required	Permit issued by the local police required for staying for less than 24 hours and permit issued by the Norwegian police for staying for more than 24 hours.
Jersey	Visa not required	
Kosovo	Visa not required	90 days: ID card valid
Russia	Special authorization required	Several closed cities and regions in Russia require special authorization.
South Ossetia	Visa not required	Multiple entry visa to Russia and three-day prior notification are required to enter South Ossetia.
Transnistria	Visa not required	Registration required after 24h.
Africa
British Indian Ocean Territory	Special permit required	Special permit required.
Eritrea outside Asmara	Travel permit required	To travel in the rest of the country, a Travel Permit for Foreigners is required (20 Eritrean nakfa).
Mayotte	Visa not required	Freedom of movement; ID card valid
Réunion	Visa not required	Freedom of movement; ID card valid
Ascension Island	eVisa	3 months within any year period.
Saint Helena	Visitor's Pass required	Visitor's Pass granted on arrival valid for 4/10/21/60/90 days for 12/14/16/20/25 pound sterling.
Tristan da Cunha	Permission required	Permission to land required for 15/30 pounds sterling (yacht/ship passenger) for Tristan da Cunha Island or 20 pounds sterling for Gough Island, Inaccessible Island or Nightingale Islands.
Sahrawi Arab Democratic Republic		Undefined visa regime in the Western Sahara controlled territory.
Somaliland	Visa on arrival	30 days for 30 US dollars, payable on arrival.
Sudan	Travel permit required	All foreigners traveling more than 25 kilometers outside of Khartoum must obtain a travel permit.
(Sudan) Darfur	Travel permit required	Separate travel permit is required.
Asia
Hong Kong	Visa not required	3 months
India PAP/RAP	PAP/RAP required	Protected Area Permit (PAP) required for whole states of Nagaland and Sikkim and parts of states Manipur, Arunachal Pradesh, Uttaranchal, Jammu and Kashmir, Rajasthan, Himachal Pradesh. Restricted Area Permit (RAP) required for all of Andaman and Nicobar Islands and parts of Sikkim. Some of these requirements are occasionally lifted for a year.
Iraqi Kurdistan	eVisa	30 days
Kazakhstan	Special permission required	Special permission required for the town of Baikonur and surrounding areas in Kyzylorda Oblast, and the town of Gvardeyskiy near Almaty.
(Iran) Kish Island	Visa not required	Visitors to Kish Island do not require a visa.
Macao	Visa not required	90 days
Malaysia Sabah and Sarawak	Visa not required	These states have their own immigration authorities and passport is required to travel to them, however the same visa applies.
Maldives	Permission required	With the exception of the capital Malé, tourists are generally prohibited from visiting non-resort islands without the express permission of the Government of Maldives.
North Korea outside Pyongyang	Special permit required	People are not allowed to leave the capital city, tourists can only leave the capital with a governmental tourist guide (no independent moving)
Palestine	Visa not required	Arrival by sea to Gaza Strip not allowed.
Taiwan	Visa not required	90 days
(Tajikistan) Gorno-Badakhshan Autonomous Province	OIVR permit required	OIVR permit required (15+5 Tajikistani Somoni) and another special permit (free of charge) is required for Lake Sarez.
(China) Tibet Autonomous Region	TTP required	Tibet Travel Permit required (10 US Dollars).
Turkmenistan	Special permit required	A special permit, issued prior to arrival by Ministry of Foreign Affairs, is required if visiting the following places: Atamurat, Cheleken, Dashoguz, Serakhs and Serhetabat.
(United Nations) Korean Demilitarized Zone	Restricted zone	
(United Nations) UNDOF Zone and Ghajar	Restricted zone	
(Vietnam) Phú Quốc	Visa not required	30 days
Yemen	Special permission required	Special permission needed for travel outside Sanaa or Aden.
Caribbean and North Atlantic
Anguilla	Visa not required	3 months
Aruba	Visa not required	30 days, extendable to 180 days
Bermuda	Visa not required	Up to 6 months, decided on arrival.
(Netherlands) Bonaire, St. Eustatius and Saba	Visa not required	3 months
British Virgin Islands	Visa not required	30 days, extensions possible
(Colombia) San Andrés and Leticia	Tourist Card on arrival	Visitors arriving at Gustavo Rojas Pinilla International Airport and Alfredo Vásquez Cobo International Airport must buy tourist cards on arrival.
Cayman Islands	Visa not required	6 months
Curaçao	Visa not required	3 months
(France) French Guiana	Visa not required	Freedom of movement; ID card valid
(France) French West Indies	Visa not required	Freedom of movement; ID card valid |; French West Indies refers to Martinique, Guadeloupe, Saint Martin and Saint Barthélemy.
Greenland	Visa not required	
(Venezuela) Margarita Island	Visa not required	All visitors are fingerprinted.
Montserrat	Visa not required	6 months: ID card valid. (for max. 14 days)
Puerto Rico	Visa Waiver Program	Visa not required under the Visa Waiver Program, for 90 days on arrival from overseas for 2 years. ESTA required.
Saint Pierre and Miquelon	Visa not required	ID card valid.
Sint Maarten	Visa not required	3 months
Turks and Caicos Islands	Visa not required	90 days
U.S. Virgin Islands	Visa Waiver Program	Visa not required under the Visa Waiver Program, for 90 days on arrival from overseas for 2 years. ESTA required.
Oceania
American Samoa	Visitor Permit	30 days. Travelers do not need a visa if they have a printed or digital copy of the Visitor Permit.
(Australia) Ashmore and Cartier Islands	Special authorisation required	Special authorisation required.
(France) Clipperton Island	Special permit required	Special permit required.
Cook Islands	Visa not required	31 days
(Fiji) Lau Province	Special permission required	Special permission required.
French Polynesia	Visa not required	ID card valid.
Guam	Visa Waiver Program	Visa not required under the Visa Waiver Program, for 90 days on arrival from overseas for 2 years. ESTA required.
New Caledonia	Visa not required	ID card valid.
Niue	Visa on arrival	30 days
Northern Mariana Islands	Visa Waiver Program	Visa not required under the Visa Waiver Program, for 90 days on arrival from overseas for 2 years. ESTA required.
Pitcairn Islands	Visa not required	14 days visa free and landing fee 35 USD or tax of 5 USD if not going ashore.
Tokelau	Entry permit required	
United States Minor Outlying Islands	Special permits required	Special permits required for Baker Island, Howland Island, Jarvis Island, Johnston Atoll, Kingman Reef, Midway Atoll, Palmyra Atoll and Wake Island.
Wallis and Futuna	Visa not required	ID card valid.
South America
Galápagos	Pre-registration required	Online pre-registration is required. Transit Control Card must also be obtained at the airport prior to departure.
South Atlantic and Antarctica
Falkland Islands	Visa not required	Visa is not required.
South Georgia and the South Sandwich Islands	Permit required	Pre-arrival permit from the Commissioner required (72 hours/1 month for 110/160 pounds sterling).
Antarctica		Special permits required for British Antarctic Territory, French Southern and Antarctic Lands, Argentine Antarctica, (Australia) Australian Antarctic Territory, (Antártica Chilena Province) Chilean Antarctic Territory, (Australia) Heard Island and McDonald Islands, (Norway) Peter I Island, (Norway) Queen Maud Land, (New Zealand) Ross Dependency.

== Diplomatic passports ==
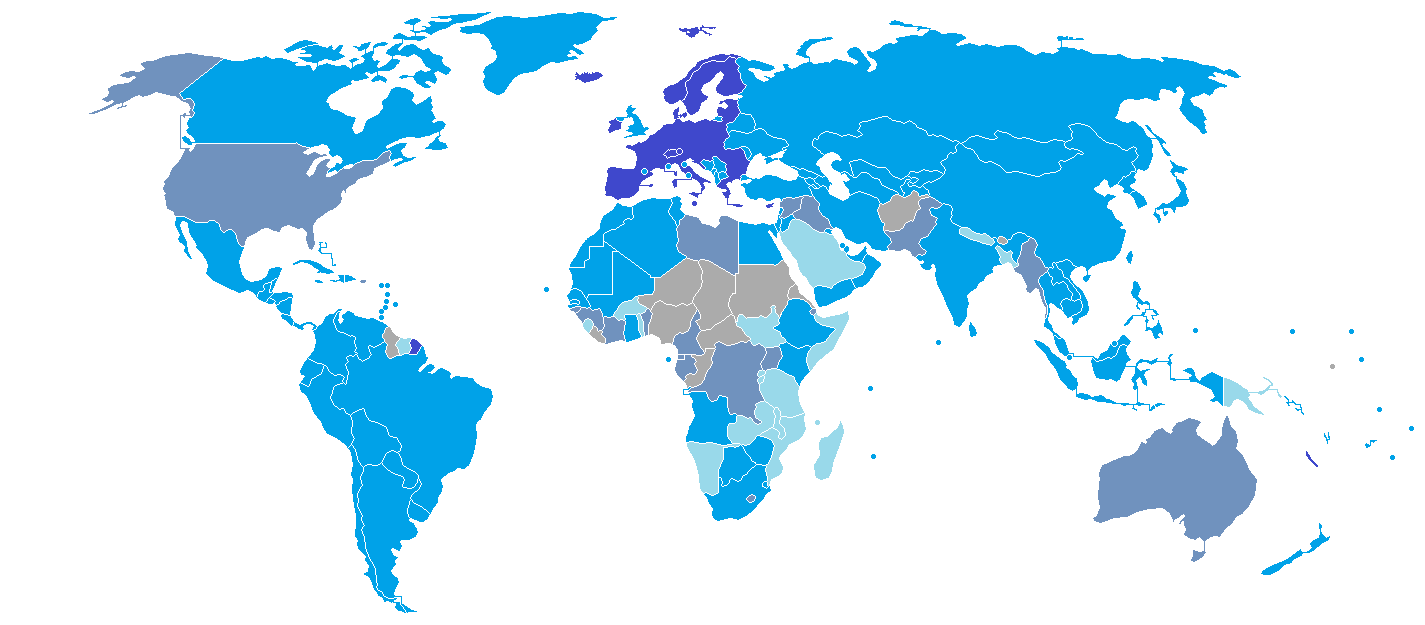
European Union (unlimited access) Visa-free Visa on arrival Pre-arrival Internet registration required (ESTA, eVisitor) Visa required

A Hungarian ordinary passport, with visa-free access to all of the world's developed countries, is a very convenient travel document by international standards. However, it is not as handy as a Hungarian diplomatic passport, which has even less visa restrictions attached to it. Several countries offer visa-free access to holders of a Hungarian diplomatic passport, but not to ordinary passport holders. This is notably the case with the People's Republic of China since 1992, Russia (since 2001). and India (since 2003). As of July 2009, Hungarian diplomats can enter all G8+5 countries without a visa. The Hungarian diplomatic passport holds the distinction of being the only travel document in the world granting such visa-free entry to all G8+5 member states.^{[a]}

In total holders of various categories of official Hungarian passports have additional visa-free access to the following countries – Algeria (diplomatic passports), Azerbaijan (diplomatic or service passports), Belarus (diplomatic or service passports), China (diplomatic or service passports), Cuba (diplomatic or service passports), Egypt (diplomatic passports), India (diplomatic or official passports), Indonesia (diplomatic or service passports), Iran (diplomatic passports), Kazakhstan (diplomatic or service passports), Laos (diplomatic or official passports), Mongolia (diplomatic or official passports), Russia (diplomatic and service passports), Tajikistan (diplomatic or service passports), Turkmenistan (diplomatic or service passports) and Uzbekistan (diplomatic passports), Vietnam (diplomatic, official, service or special passports), Yemen (diplomatic passports). Holders of diplomatic or service passports of any country have visa-free access to Cape Verde, Ethiopia, Mali and Zimbabwe.

== Right to consular protection in non-EU countries ==
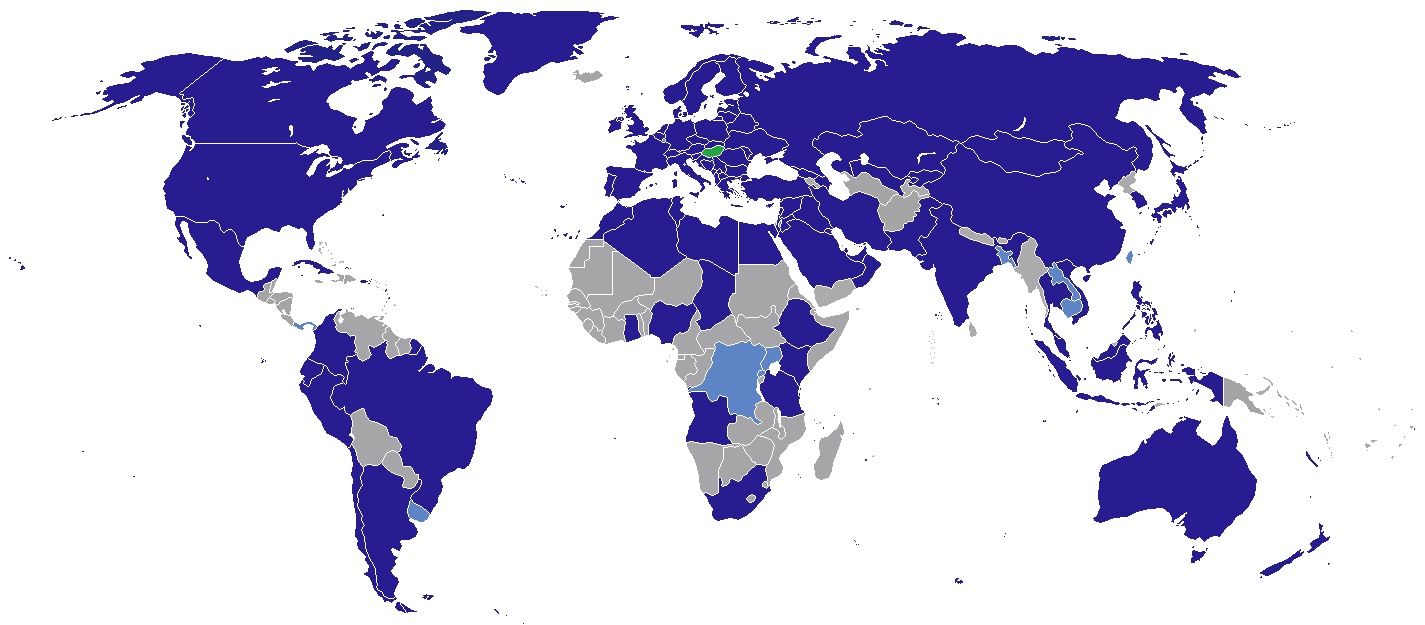
Countries with Hungarian diplomatic missions

When they are in a territory with no Hungarian consular facilities, because Hungarian citizens are also citizens of the EU, they have the right to get consular assistance from any other EU country with a diplomatic mission in that territory.

== Non-visa restrictions ==
=== Blank passport pages ===
Many countries require a minimum number of blank pages to be available in the passport being presented, typically one or two pages. Endorsement pages, which often appear after the visa pages, are not counted as being valid or available.

=== Vaccination ===
Cover of the new International Certificate of Vaccination issued by the Bureau of Quarantine in the Philippines since 2021

The African countries of Angola, Benin, Burkina Faso, Burundi, Cameroon, Central African Republic, Democratic Republic of the Congo, Republic of the Congo, Côte d'Ivoire, Gabon, Ghana, Guinea-Bissau, Mali, Niger, Sierra Leone and Togo, South Sudan and Uganda, along with French Guiana in South America, require all incoming passengers older than nine months to one year, to have a current International Certificate of Vaccination or Prophylaxis.

Some other countries require vaccination only if the passenger is coming from an infected area or has visited one recently or has transited for 12 hours in those countries: Algeria, Botswana, Cabo Verde, Chad, Djibouti, Egypt, Eswatini, Ethiopia, Gambia, Ghana, Guinea, Lesotho, Libya, Equatorial Guinea, Eritrea, Madagascar, Malawi, Mauritania, Mauritius, Mozambique, Namibia, Nigeria, Papua New Guinea, Seychelles, Somalia, South Africa, Sudan, Tunisia, Uganda, Tanzania, Zambia and Zimbabwe.

=== Passport validity length ===
Very few countries, such as Paraguay, just require a valid passport on arrival.

However many countries and groupings now require only an identity card – especially from their neighbours. Other countries may have special bilateral arrangements that depart from the generality of their passport validity length policies to shorten the period of passport validity required for each other's citizens or even accept passports that have already expired (but not been cancelled).

Some countries, such as Japan, Ireland and the United Kingdom, require a passport valid throughout the period of the intended stay.

In the absence of specific bilateral agreements, countries requiring passports to be valid for at least 6 more months on arrival include Afghanistan, Algeria, Anguilla, Bahrain, Bhutan, Botswana, British Virgin Islands, Brunei, Cambodia, Cameroon, Cape Verde, Cayman Islands, Central African Republic, Chad, Comoros, Costa Rica, Côte d'Ivoire, Curaçao, Ecuador, Egypt, El Salvador, Equatorial Guinea, Fiji, Gabon, Guinea Bissau, Guyana, Haiti, India, Indonesia, Iran, Iraq, Israel, Jordan, Kenya, Kiribati, Kuwait, Laos, Madagascar, Malaysia, Marshall Islands, Mongolia, Myanmar, Namibia, Nepal, Nicaragua, Nigeria, Oman, Palau, Papua New Guinea, Peru, Philippines, Qatar, Rwanda, Samoa, Saudi Arabia, Singapore, Solomon Islands, Somalia, Sri Lanka, Sudan, Suriname, Tanzania, Thailand, Timor-Leste, Tokelau, Tonga, Turkey, Tuvalu, Uganda, United Arab Emirates, Vanuatu, Venezuela, and Vietnam.

Countries requiring passports valid for at least 4 months on arrival include Micronesia and Zambia.

Countries requiring passports with a validity of at least 3 months beyond the date of intended departure include Azerbaijan, Bosnia and Herzegovina, Honduras, Montenegro, Nauru, Moldova and New Zealand. Similarly, the EEA countries of Iceland, Liechtenstein, Norway, all European Union countries (except Ireland) together with Switzerland also require 3 months validity beyond the date of the bearer's intended departure unless the bearer is an EEA or Swiss national.

Countries requiring passports valid for at least 3 months on arrival include Albania, North Macedonia, Panama, and Senegal.

Bermuda requires passports to be valid for at least 45 days upon entry.

Countries that require a passport validity of at least one month beyond the date of intended departure include Eritrea, Hong Kong, Lebanon, Macau, the Maldives and South Africa.

==== Maximum passport age ====
Countries of the Schengen area require non-EU passports to be less than 10 years old upon entry.

=== Criminal record ===
Some countries, including Australia, Canada, Fiji, New Zealand and the United States, routinely deny entry to non-citizens who have a criminal record, while others impose restrictions depending on the type of conviction and the length of the sentence.

=== Persona non grata ===
The government of a country can declare a diplomat persona non grata, banning them from entering the country or expelling them if they have already entered. In non-diplomatic use, the authorities of a country may also declare a foreigner persona non grata permanently or temporarily, usually because of unlawful activity.

=== Israeli stamps ===
Kuwait, Lebanon, Libya, and Yemen do not allow entry to people with passport stamps from Israel or whose passports have either a used or an unused Israeli visa, or where there is evidence of previous travel to Israel such as entry or exit stamps from neighbouring border posts in transit countries such as Jordan and Egypt.

To circumvent this Arab League boycott of Israel, the Israeli immigration services have now mostly ceased to stamp foreign nationals' passports on either entry to or exit from Israel (unless the entry is for some work-related purposes). Since 15 January 2013, Israel no longer stamps foreign passports at Ben Gurion Airport. Passports are still (as of 22 June 2017) stamped at Erez when passing into and out of Gaza.

Iran refuses admission to holders of passports containing an Israeli visa or stamp that is less than 12 months old.

=== Biometrics ===
Several countries mandate that all travellers, or all foreign travellers, be fingerprinted on arrival and will refuse admission to or even arrest travellers who refuse to comply. In some countries, such as the United States, this may apply even to transit passengers who merely wish to change planes rather than go landside.

Fingerprinting countries/regions include Afghanistan, Argentina, Brunei, Cambodia, China, Ethiopia, Ghana, Guinea, India, Japan, Kenya (both fingerprints and a photo are taken), Malaysia upon entry and departure, Mongolia, Saudi Arabia, the Schengen Area, Singapore, South Korea, Taiwan, Thailand, Uganda, the United Arab Emirates and the United States.

Many countries also require a photo be taken of people entering the country. The United States, which does not fully implement exit control formalities at its land frontiers (although long mandated by its own legislation), intends to implement facial recognition for passengers departing from international airports to identify people who overstay their visa.

Together with fingerprint and face recognition, iris scanning is one of three biometric identification technologies internationally standardised since 2006 by the International Civil Aviation Organization (ICAO) for use in e-passports and the United Arab Emirates conducts iris scanning on visitors who need to apply for a visa. The United States Department of Homeland Security has announced plans to greatly increase the biometric data it collects at US borders. In 2018, Singapore began trials of iris scanning at three land and maritime immigration checkpoints.

== See also ==
- Visa requirements for European Union citizens
- Hungarian nationality law
- Hungarian passport
- Hungarian identity card
- Visa policy of the Schengen Area
