= Gruener =

Gruener or Grüner is a German and Jewish surname.

- Bernard Gruener
- Garrett Gruener
- George Grüner (born 1943), Hungarian physicist
- Lukas Gruener
- Martin Grüner (1929-2018), German politician
- Olivia Grüner
