= Hungarian passport =

Passport of Hungary issued to Hungarian citizens

Hungarian passport; Magyar útlevél
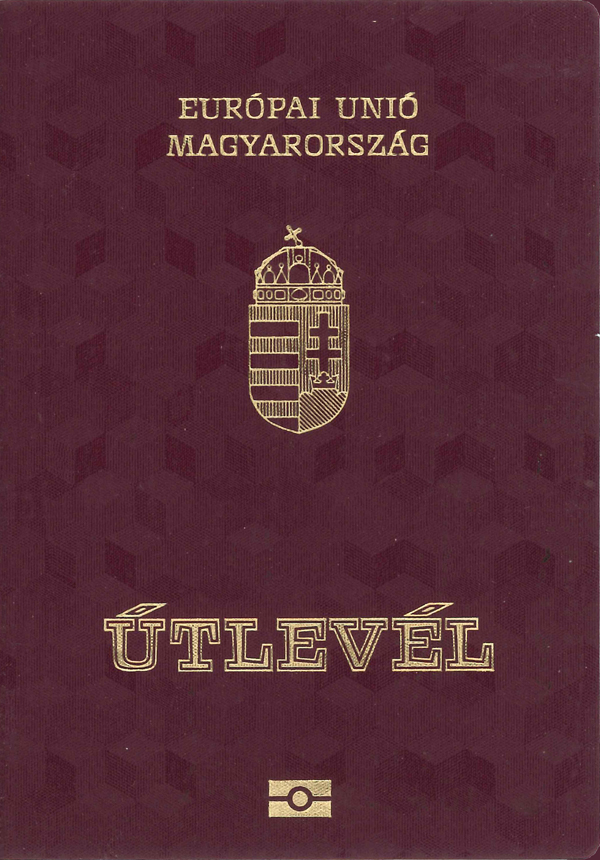
- Front cover of a contemporary Hungarian biometric passport. The word in Hungarian for "Passport", "Útlevél", literally means "Road letter"

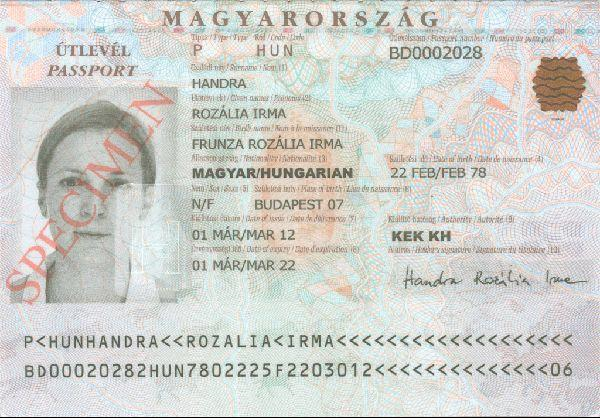
- The data page of a contemporary Hungarian biometric passport
- Type: Passport
- Issued by: Hungary
- First issued: August 29, 2006 (first biometric passport); March 1, 2012 (current version)
- Purpose: Identification
- Valid in: All countries (as per page 1)
- Eligibility: Hungarian citizenship
- Expiration: 10 years after issuance
- Cost: 14000 HUF (10 years) / 7500 HUF (5 years) / 2500 HUF (1 year) / 2500 HUF (5 years, 12-18 years old) / 2500 HUF (5 years, 6-12 years old) / 2500 HUF (3 years, under 6 years old) + 19000 HUF (7 day service) / 29000 HUF (3 day service) / 39000 HUF (1 day service)

Hungarian passports (Hungarian: magyar útlevél) are issued to Hungarian citizens for international travel by The Central Data Processing, Registration and Election Office of the Hungarian Ministry of the Interior. Every Hungarian citizen is also a citizen of the European Union. The passport, besides the national identity card allows for free rights of movement and residence in any of the states of the European Union, European Economic Area and Switzerland.

== Types ==
Personal
Ordinary passports issued to citizens valid for two, five, or ten years.

The five year passport is issued having in mind the following birthday of the applicant, while the ten year passport is issued having in mind the previous birthday of the applicant. For example, if an applicant who is born on the 29th of September 1990, and applies for a 5 year passport on the 1st of November 2021, the passport will be valid until the 29th of September 2027, while the 10 year passport will be valid until the 29th of September 2031.

Official
Diplomatic
Service
Foreign service
Seamen service

== Physical appearance ==
As of 2023, regular Hungarian EU passports are burgundy red in colour (before a navy blue color was in use), with the Hungarian coat of arms emblazoned in the center of the front cover. The words "útlevél" (passport, or more literally, Roadletter) inscribed below the coat of arms and "Európai Unió" (European Union), "Magyarország" (Hungary) above. The new biometric Hungarian passport has the standard biometric symbol at the bottom.

The visa pages have musical notes of the Szózat visible in UV light. The identity information page contains the title and the first eight lines of the National Anthem in the author's handwriting embossed.

=== Identity information page ===
The Hungarian passport includes the following data:

- Photo of passport Holder
- Type (P)
- Code (HUN)
- Passport No.
- Surname (1)
- Given Names (2)
- Nationality (3)
- Date of birth (4)
- Sex (5)
- Place of birth (6)
- Date of issue (7)
- Date of expiry (8)
- Authority (9)
- Holder's Signature (10)

The information page ends with the Machine Readable Zone. This zone contains most of the above information, but readable by a computer through a camera. The names will have all letters converted to the range A-Z. Other letters marks like ´ are stripped.

=== Languages ===
The data page/information page is printed in Hungarian, English and French; translation in all other official languages of the E.U. is present elsewhere in the passport.

== Passports ==
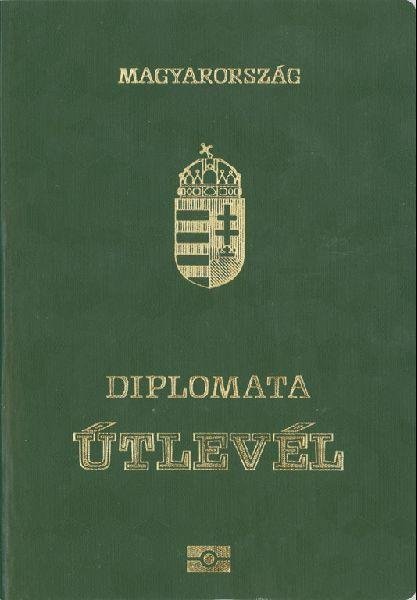
Diplomatic passport, in biometric version

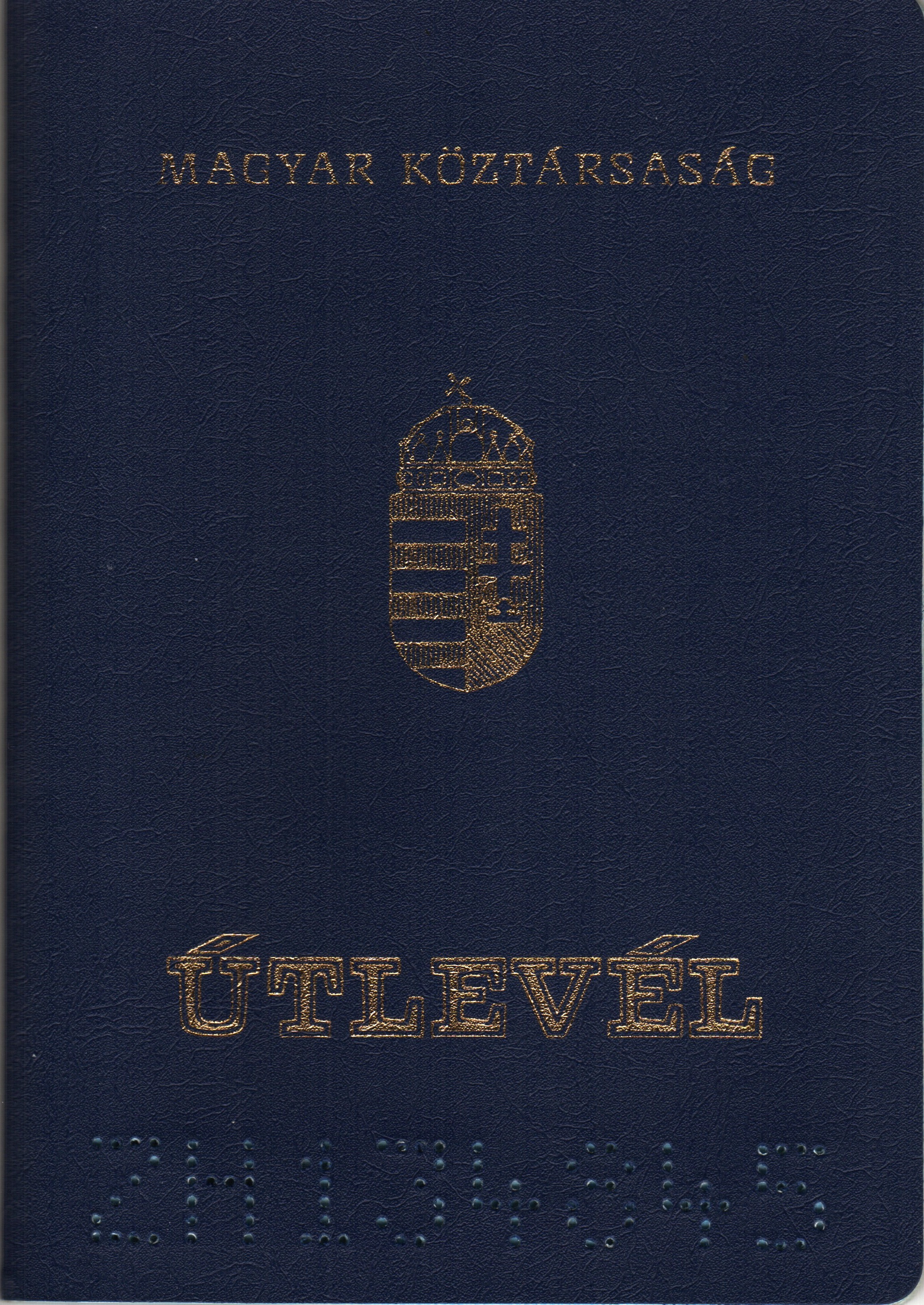
Regular passport, pre-biometric version

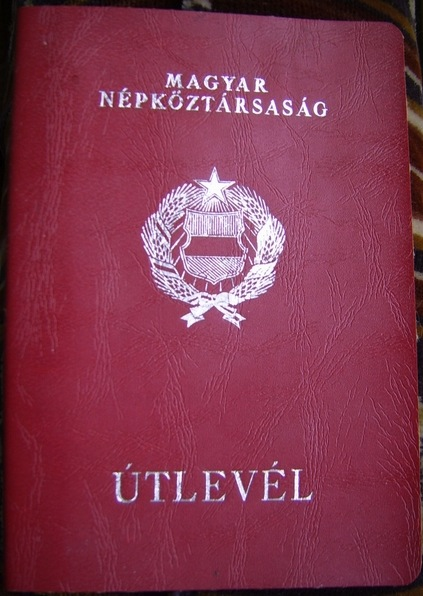
Regular passport, 1972

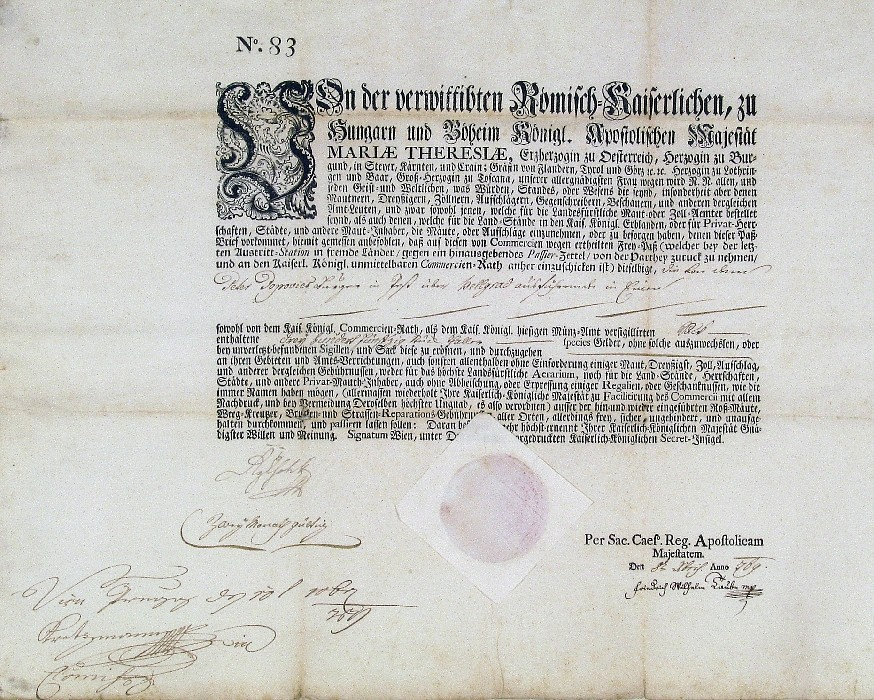
Historic Hungarian passport of Peter Popovics from Pest, 1769

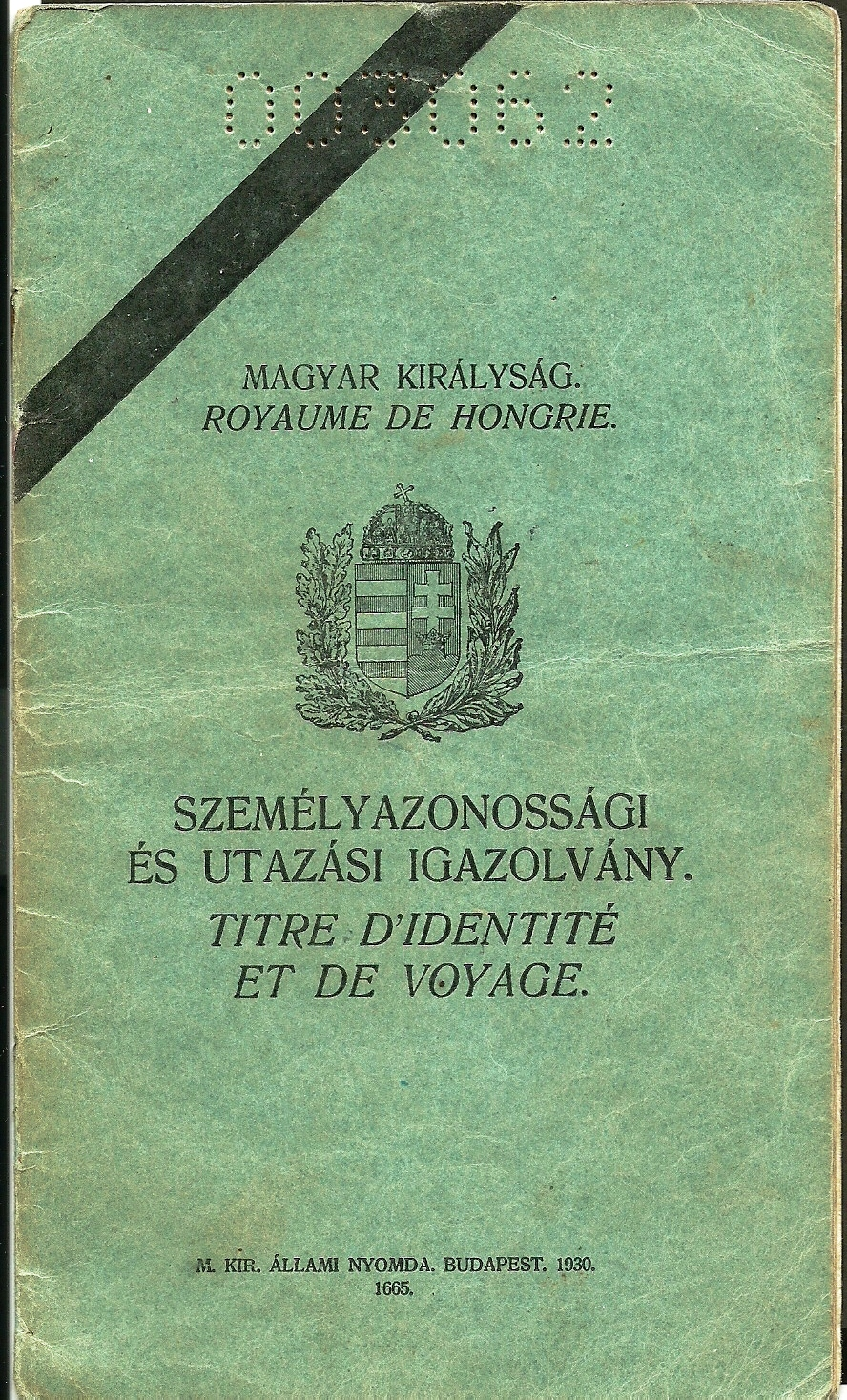
1944 Hungarian travel document issued to a stateless Jewish woman

== Visa free travel ==
Visa requirements for Hungarian citizens Hungary Freedom of movement Visa free Visa issued upon arrival eVisa Visa available both on arrival or online Visa required prior to arrival

Visa requirements for Hungarian citizens are administrative entry restrictions by the authorities of other states placed on citizens of Hungary. As of 2025 Hungarian citizens have visa-free or visa on arrival access to 185 countries and territories, ranking the Hungarian passport 7th in terms of travel freedom according to the Henley Passport Index.

== Diplomatic passport visa requirements ==
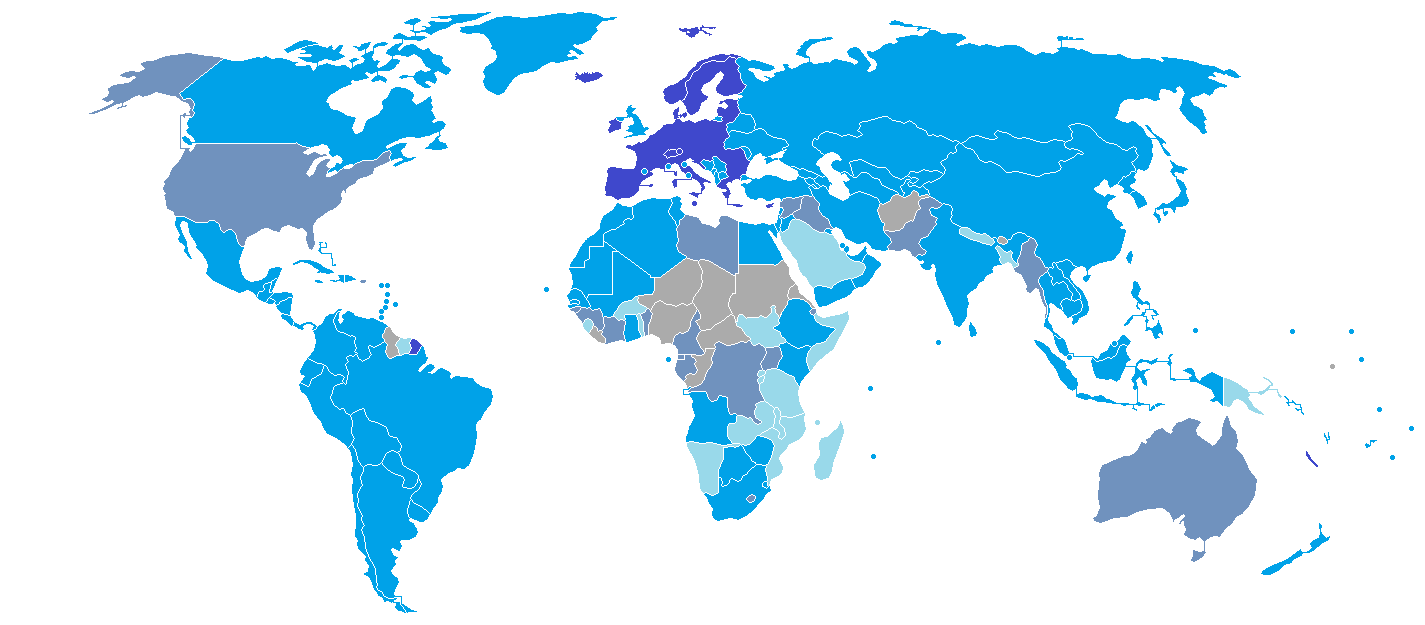
European Union (unlimited access) Visa-free Visa on arrival Pre-arrival Internet registration required (ESTA, eVisitor) Visa required

A Hungarian ordinary passport, with visa-free access to all of the world's developed countries, is a very convenient travel document by international standards. However, it is not as handy as a Hungarian diplomatic passport, which has even fewer visa restrictions attached to it. Several countries offer visa-free access to holders of a Hungarian diplomatic passport, but not to ordinary passport holders. This is notably the case with China (since 1992), Russia (since 2001). and India (since 2003). As of July 2009, Hungarian diplomats can enter all G8+5 countries without a visa. The Hungarian diplomatic passport holds the distinction of being the only travel document in the world granting such visa-free entry to all G8+5 member states.^{[a]}

== See also ==
- Visa requirements for Hungarian citizens
- Passports of the European Union
