= Katalin Kamarás =

Hungarian spectroscopist

Katalin Kamarás is a Hungarian spectroscopist and physical chemist whose research has largely focused on spectroscopic observations of carbon nanotubes and high-temperature superconductors. She is a research professor in the HUN-REN Wigner Research Centre for Physics in Budapest.

== Education and career ==
Kamarás received a diploma in chemistry from Eötvös Loránd University in 1976, and completed her Ph.D. there in 1979 with the thesis Physicochemical investigations on electrically conducting donor-acceptor salts supervised by George Grüner. She later received a candidate degree from the Hungarian Academy of Sciences in 1991, a doctor of science degree from the academy in 1996, and a habilitation through the Budapest University of Technology and Economics in 2000.

She began working for the Central Research Institute of Physics of the Hungarian Academy of Sciences, a predecessor of the Wigner Research Centre, as a research assistant in 1976. She became a research scientist there in 1979, a tenured senior research scientist in 1992, and a research professor in 2010.

== Recognition ==
Kamarás received the Jánossy Prize of the Central Research Institute of Physics in 1981, the Schmidt Prize of the Eötvös Lorand Physical Society in 1991, and the Physics Prize of the Hungarian Academy of Sciences in 2002.

She was elected as a corresponding member of the Hungarian Academy of Sciences in 2010, and as a full member in 2016. She became a member of Academia Europaea in 2014.
