= Bernard Borggreve =

German forestry scientist (1836–1914)

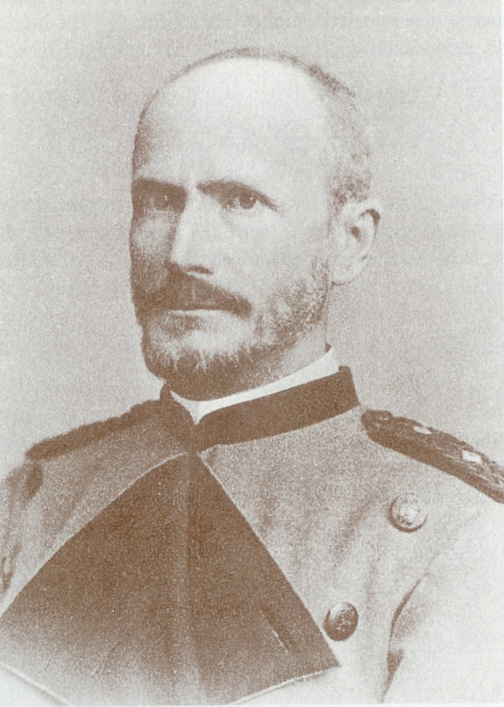
Bernard Robert August Borggreve

Bernard Robert August Borggreve (6 July 1836, Magdeburg – 5 April 1914, Bendorf) was a German forestry scientist. He is known for introducing the "Borggreve method", a silvicultural process for selection cutting of trees.

== Biography ==
He received his education at the Forestry Academy in Eberswalde as a pupil of Julius Theodor Christian Ratzeburg, followed by studies at the University of Göttingen. In 1864 he was named head of the Hohenlohe forestry service at the Koszęcin palace in Koschentin, and two years later, became a lecturer of forestry at the Agricultural Academy in Bonn-Poppelsdorf. From 1868 he taught classes in zoology and botany at the newly founded Academy of Forestry in Hann. Münden.

In 1872 he was appointed head forester in Zöckeritz (near Bitterfeld), and in 1879 returned to Hann. Münden as a professor and director of the forest academy. In 1891 he was appointed by the Prussian Ministry of Agriculture as Oberforstmeister in Wiesbaden.

== Published works ==
With Julius Theodor Grunert (1809–1889), he was co-editor of the journal Forstlichen Blätter; after Grunert's death he became its sole editor. In 1871 he published an edition of Georg Ludwig Hartig's "Lehrbuch für Förster" (from the 3rd edition, 1811). His other noteworthy written efforts are:

- Die Vogel-Fauna von Norddeutschland, 1869 – On the bird fauna of northern Germany.
- Die forstabschätzung; ein grundriss der forstertragsregelung und waldwertrechnung, 1888 – Forest assessment; an outline of a forestry income plan and forest value calculation.
- Die Verbreitung und wirtschaftliche Bedeutung der wichtigeren Waldbaumaren innerhalb Deutschlands, 1888 – The distribution and economic significance of the more important forest trees within Germany.
- Die holzzucht; ein grundriss für unterricht und wirtschaft, 1891 – Wood types: an outline for education and economy.
