= Gruner =

Gruner is a surname. Notable people with the surname include:

- Dov Gruner (1912–1947), Jewish Zionist leader
- Eduard Gruner, Swiss engineer
- Elioth Gruner (1882–1939), Australian painter
- Gottlieb Sigmund Gruner (1717–1778), Swiss cartographer and geologist
- Klaus Gruner (born 1952), German handball player
- Nicholas Gruner (1942–2015), Canadian priest
- Olivier Gruner (born 1960), French kickboxer
- Paul Gruner (1869–1957), Swiss physicist
- Peter Gruner, professional wrestler known as Billy Kidman
- Silvia Gruner (born 1959), Mexican artist
- Sybille Gruner (born 1969), German handball player
- Walther Gruner (1905–1979), German-born British singing teacher
- Werner Gruner (1904–1995), German engineer

== See also ==
- Grüner (disambiguation)
