= Hungarian identity card =

National identity card of Hungary

Hungarian identity card (Személyazonosító igazolvány)
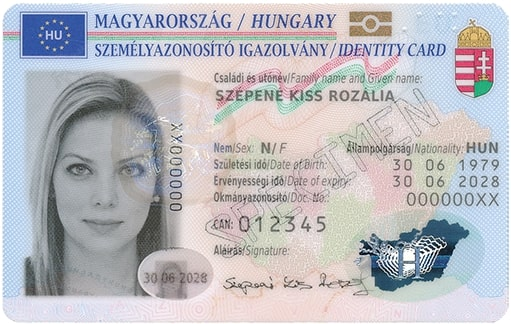
- The newest version of the Hungarian identity card
- Type: Identity card, optional replacement for passport in the listed countries
- Issued by: Hungary
- First issued: 2 August 2021
- Purpose: proof of identity
- Valid in: EFTA; European Union; United Kingdom (EU Settlement Scheme); Rest of Europe (except Belarus, Russia, and Ukraine) Georgia; Montserrat (max. 14 days); Overseas France; Turkey
- Eligibility: Hungarian citizen over 14 years of age (mandatory)
- Expiration: 60 years (age 65 or over); 6 years (age 18-64); 3 years (age 12-18)

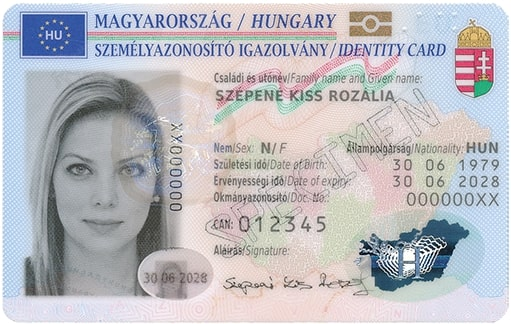
The front of the current Hungarian identity card

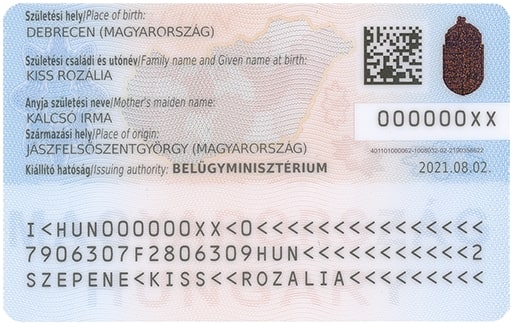
The reverse of the current Hungarian identity card

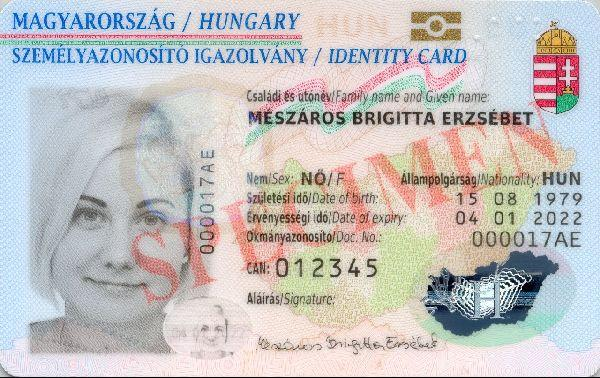
The former Hungarian identity card (issued until August 2021, still valid)

Hungarian identity cards (Hungarian: Személyazonosító igazolvány, colloquially "személyi") are not compulsory for Hungarian citizens, although they may be obtained by anyone after birth. However, every citizen from 14 years of age must have at least one of the three identity documents: national identity card; passport, under the age of 17 years; or a photo-card driving licence for anyone over 17 years old. Citizens can travel anywhere in Europe (except Belarus, Russia, and Ukraine) as well as to Georgia, French overseas territories, Montserrat, Turkey and organized tours to Tunisia using only this identity card.

Currently, there are three types of valid identity documents (Személyi igazolvány, abbr. Sz.ig.). The oldest valid type is a hard-covered, multi-page book issued before 1989 by the People's Republic of Hungary (Internal passport); the second type is a soft-cover, multi-page book issued after the restoration of democracy in 1989. Each of these documents has an original photo of the owner embedded, with original signatures of the owner and the local police representative. The third type, accepted since 2000, is a plastic card, usually called a "Personal Identity Card", with the photo and the signature of the holder digitally reproduced.

The card shows the owner's full name, maiden name if applicable, birth date and place, mother's name, sex, and the card's validity period, as well as the local state authority which issued the card. The card has a unique identification string composed of six numbers and two letters. It does not have any information about the owner's residential address, nor their Personal ID—this sensitive information is contained on a separate card, called the Authority ID (commonly called lakcímkártya, "residential address card"). The Personal ID, which originated in the Communist era, is no longer used as an identification number, but only as a statistical signature.

Other valid documents are the passport (blue or red, containing an RFID chip) and the driver's license; an individual is required to have at least one of them on hand at all times. The Personal Identity Card was required to vote in state elections or to open a bank account in the country, but now banks should accept any of the three identity documents, such as the Passport and the photo-card driving licence.

== See also ==
- National identity cards in the European Union
