= Kristopher Grunert =

Canadian photographer

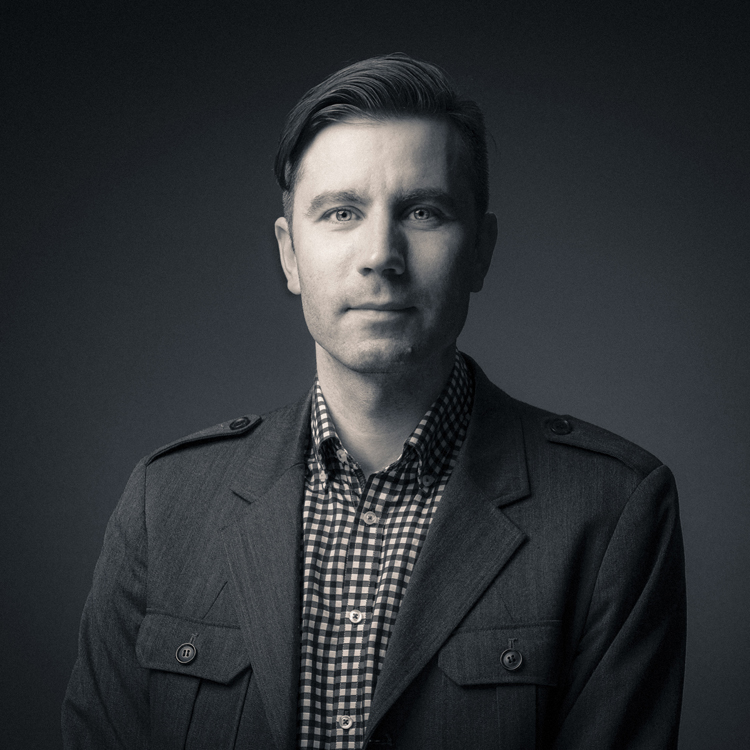
- Self portrait taken in 2016
- Born: April 5, 1978 (age 48); Yorkton, Saskatchewan
- Style: Architectural photography, industrial photography, commercial photography, fine art photography
- Website: www.grunertimaging.com

Kristopher Grunert (born April 5, 1978) is a Canadian commercial and fine art photographer. He is also an NFT photographer.

== Biography ==
Kristopher Grunert was born in Yorkton, Saskatchewan. He credits his prairie upbringing for developing his visual and spatial sense. Perhaps his childhood environment is what propelled him toward scenes that honor human fortitude and expansion. Known for his appreciation for architectural structures and industrial processes, Grunert's style marries the phenomena of Earth's cycles with man-made creations.

In a personal development project called The Inspirers, Grunert pays homage to an expanding number of notable visionaries who have helped shape his vision. Among them are, architect I. M. Pei, director Andrei Tarkovsky, futurist Buckminster Fuller, aviation pioneer Amelia Earhart, and photographer Sebastião Salgado.

== Work ==
His commercial work is mainly focused on developing corporate media libraries, annual reports, documentation of architectural projects, and corporate publications, including Canadian Pacific Limited. Additionally, his commercial work extends to consumer publications, such as Wallpaper, Dezeen, and Applied Arts Magazine. As an NFT photographer, he is among the top selling artists on Ephimera.

In 2025, Grunert co-founded Creative project partners (Cpp), a visual storytelling studio focused on architecture, engineering, construction, and the built world. Serving as Creative Director, he leads photography and multimedia production for global AEC firms and real estate developers. Cpp was established to help visionary clients translate complex ideas into impactful visual narratives across photography, video, drone, and digital asset management solutions.

== Exhibitions ==
=== NFT exhibitions ===
- 2021 Exhibit I / Ephimera
- 2021 NFT Art International / Stratosphere / Beijing

=== Solo exhibitions ===
- 2012 As Above, So Below Godfrey Dean Art Gallery / Yorkton
- 2008 City: My Last 20 Polaroids / Jacana Gallery / Vancouver

=== Group exhibitions ===
- 2018 Collective Noun / Ian Tan Gallery / Capture Photography Festival
- 2017 Imagenation / Paris
- 2017 Lit - Ecc Preview Exhibit
- 2017 Rad Hombres / Vancouver
- 2009 The Seylynn Lights / Mopla / La
- 2009 Vancouver Altered / On The Rise Collective / Vancouver
- 2007 Urban Development - Trunk Gallery - Vancouver, Canada Viaducts + Arteries / Trunk Gallery / Vancouver
- 2006 Urban Spaces / Viaducts / Jacana Gallery / Vancouver
- 2005 (Dis)Tence / 125 Magazine / St.Luke's / London
- 2005 (Dis)Tence / 125 Magazine / Corbis Gallery / NYC
- 2004 Crop / Lumen Gallery / Vancouver
- 2004 The Zone + The State Of Things / Ad!Dict Gallery / Brussels
- 2004 The Zone / Fotokomission / Berlin
- 2003 Industria / Gallery 83 / Vancouver
- 2002 Endless Journey / Gallery 83 / Vancouver
- 2001 (R)Evolution / Sugar Gallery / Vancouver
- 2000 Industry 106 / Railtown Studios / Vancouver

== Awards ==
- 2017 Tokyo International Foto Awards / HM / Landscape
- 2016 Applied Arts / Creative Excellence Award
- 2016 Applied Arts / Photo Annual
- 2015 aPhotoEditor /Promo of the Year
- 2015 Lotus Awards / Best Photography
- 2014 International Photography Awards / HM
- 2010 International Photography Awards / 1st Industrial
- 2010 Photo District News / Self-Promo Awards / Best Digital Promotion
- 2010 Applied Arts / Photo Annual
- 2009 International Photography Awards / 1st / Moving Images
- 2007 International Photography Awards / HM
- 2007 Georgia Straight / Best Light Artist
- 2006 Photo District News / Photo Annual / Best Website
- 2006 International Photography Awards / HM
- 2005 International Photography Awards / HM
