= George Grüner =

Hungarian-American physicist

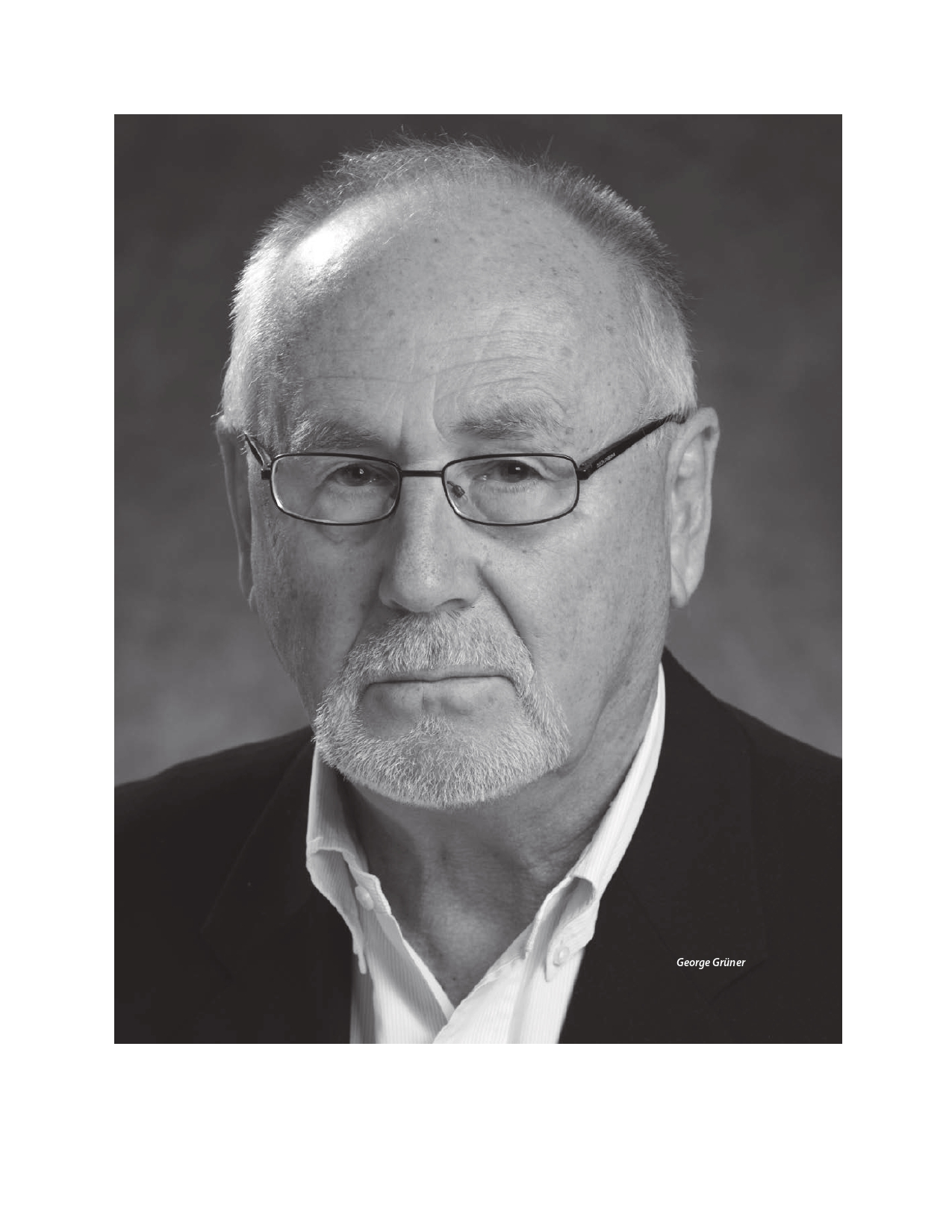
- Education: PhD, Hungarian Academy of Sciences, 1977
- Scientific career
- Fields: Electron states of matter, nanotechnology, bioelectronics
- Workplaces: University of California, Los Angeles
- Doctoral students: Katalin Kamarás

George Grüner is a Hungarian-American physicist and Distinguished Research Professor of Physics at the University of California, Los Angeles (UCLA). His research spans fundamental condensed matter physics, nanotechnology, bioelectronics, and materials science. He has authored more than 700 publications with over 46,000 citations and an h-index of 94, and holds more than two dozen issued patents.

== Education and career ==
Grüner showed early aptitude in mathematics, winning several national prizes while in high school and representing Hungary as a member of its Mathematics Olympic Team.

He completed his undergraduate and graduate studies in physics at Eötvös Loránd University, Budapest (1961–1966), and was awarded the Candidate of Sciences degree in Budapest in 1972.

== Career ==
Grüner began his professional career as a Research Scientist at the Central Research Institute for Physics, Budapest (1966–1972), followed by a postdoctoral appointment at Imperial College London (1972–1973). He returned to the Central Research Institute for Physics as Department Head (1973–1978).

He joined the University of California, Los Angeles as a Visiting Scientist (1980–1981) and was appointed Professor of Physics in 1981, Distinguished Professor of Physics in 1987, and Distinguished Research Professor of Physics in 2021.

During his tenure at UCLA, he held a visiting scientist position at several universitiesn worldwide, including the Max Planck Institute for Solid State Research, Stuttgart, and held several innovation-related positions at Nanyang Technological University, Singapore.

== Research and contributions ==
During his career, the focus of his research was on the collective behavior of electrons in matter, these underly the electrical properties of materials. His scientific activities include exploratory research, technology development, invention and innovation activity, intellectual property creation, startup companies, and as an advisor, the innovation ecosystem.

=== Electron liquids ===
Grüner used spectroscopic methods to investigate the interactions between electrons in metals and alloys and their consequences for electronic and optical properties.

=== Density waves and electron crystals ===
Grüner conducted extensive experimental research on density waves — a crystalline electronic state in metals — using dc, ac, optical, and pulsed electric field techniques. He maintained a long-standing collaboration with Nobel laureate John Bardeen to test theoretical models of the phenomenon experimentally.

=== Superconductors ===
Grüner's group explored the microwave and millimeter-wave properties of superconductors, contributing both to the fundamental understanding of superconductivity , and the application potential of superconductors.

=== Nanotechnology and carbon nanonets ===
Grüner developed a novel class of materials called Nanonets — two-dimensional, interconnected random networks of nanowires: single-walled carbon nanotubes which serve as a foundational platform for flexible electronics. His group characterized the electronic and optical properties of these structures.

=== Bioelectronics ===
Grüner's laboratory developed electronic structures integrating resistors, field-effect transistors, and electrochemical capacitors with biological environments such as blood serum and buffer solutions. His group pioneered the use of carbon nanotubes for real-time electronic detection of biological interactions. He also integrated living cells with active electronic platforms, laying groundwork for devices capable of monitoring and driving cellular functions, testing drug responses, and linking nerve cells for complex signaling systems.

== Technology development ==
=== Microwave and millimeter-wave spectroscopy ===
Grüner's group developed resonant structures, interference bridges, and phase-sensitive transmission measurement tools for characterizing materials at microwave and millimeter-wave frequencies. These instruments have been adopted by industry as standard characterization tools.

== Innovation and commercialization ==
=== Flexible and printed electronics ===
Grüner applied carbon nanonet thin films as flexible electrode scaffolds, enabling early-generation flexible organic light-emitting diodes (OLEDs), solution-processed organic solar cells, and energy storage devices.

=== Biosensors and detectors ===
His group developed electronic detection methods of the presence of biological species Notable demonstrations include the direct electronic detection of prostate-specific antigen (PSA) in serum and the tracking of enzymatic starch degradation.

=== Patents ===
Grüner is the inventor or co-inventor of more than two dozen issued patents in the areas of nanoscale materials, energy storage, energy generation, and biosensing.

== Entrepreneurship ==
- Nanomix Inc. (2001–2005): Served as Chief Technology Officer and Chief Scientist, inventing and developing a nanoscale electronic biosensor detection platform based on his UCLA research.
- Unidym Inc. (founded 2004): Founded the company and served as CEO, focusing on the industrial-scale fabrication of carbon nanotube-based products, including nanonet thin films and components for printed electronics, energy storage, and solar cell devices.

== Advisory and editorial roles ==
Grüner has served as a consultant and advisor to universities, startup companies, multinational corporations, and government and funding agencies in the United States, Asia, Europe, and the Middle East.

He has held the following editorial positions:

- Editor-in-Chief, Journal of Transitional Materials Research
- Editorial Board Member, Journal of Nanotechnology
- Editorial Board Member, Recent Patents in Nanotechnology

== Awards and honours ==
- World Economic Forum Technology Pioneer Award (2004 and 2008): Grüner is the only individual reported to have received this award on two separate occasions.
- Guggenheim Fellowship (1998): Awarded by the John Simon Guggenheim Memorial Foundation for exceptional contributions to the natural sciences.
- Alexander von Humboldt Senior American Scientist Award (1984): Granted by the Humboldt Foundation to internationally recognized scientists.
- Distinguished Professor, Budapest University of Technology and Economics.

He served as an expert panelist and emerging technology lecturer at the World Economic Forum in Davos (2003, 2008) and at the Global Competitiveness Forum in Riyadh (2009).

=== Memberships ===
- Fellow, American Physical Society (elected 1987): Recognized for experimental studies of the Kondo problem and the dynamics of charge density wave and spin density wave ground states.
- Foreign Member, Hungarian Academy of Sciences (elected 1990).

== Selected publications ==
=== Books ===
- Gor'kov, L. P.; Grüner, G. (1989). Charge Density Waves in Solids. Modern Problems in Condensed Matter Sciences. Vol. 25. Oxford: Elsevier Science. pp. ii. ISBN 9780444600738.
- Gruner, George (1994). Density Waves In Solids. Frontiers in Physics. Vol. 89. Avalon Publishing. ISBN 978-0-7382-0304-1.
- Grüner, George; Dahl, C. (1998). Millimeter and Submillimeter Wave Spectroscopy of Solids. Topics in Applied Physics. Springer Berlin Heidelberg. ISBN 978-3-540-62860-6.
- Dressel, Martin; Grüner, George (2002). Electrodynamics of Solids: Optical Properties of Electrons in Matter. Cambridge University Press. ISBN 978-0-521-59726-5.

=== Journal articles ===
- Grüner, G. (2007). "Carbon Nanonets Spark New Electronics". Scientific American. 296 (5): 76–83. doi:10.1038/scientificamerican0507-76. PMID 17500417.
- Grüner, G.; Zawadowski, A. (1974). "Magnetic Impurities in Non-magnetic Metals". Reports on Progress in Physics. 37: 1497–1583.
- Grüner, G.; Zettl, A.; Clark, W.G.; Bardeen, J. (1981). "Field and Frequency Dependence of Charge Density Wave Conduction in NbSe_{3}". Physical Review B. 24: 724.
- Brown, S.; Grüner, G. (1994). "Charge and Spin Density Waves". Scientific American. 270: 50.
- Grüner, G. (1974). "Experimental Evidence for Many-body Effects in Dilute Alloys." Advances in Physics, 23, 941.
- Organic solar cells with carbon nanotube network electrodes MW Rowell, MA Topinka, MD McGehee, HJ Prall, G Dennler, NS Sariciftci, Applied Physics Letters 88 (23)
- Grüner, G. (2006). "Carbon Nanotube Transistors for Biosensing Applications". Analytical and Bioanalytical Chemistry. 384: 322.

== Personal life ==
Grüner is married to Maria Grüner. After accepting his position at UCLA, the couple left Hungary and lost Hungarian citizenship; following Hungary's political transition of 1990, he became a dual Hungarian-American citizen. They have a daughter, Dora, and a son, Daniel.

Grüner is an art collector. The Grüner Collection has been exhibited in several museums and is considered a significant holding of Hungarian neo-avant-garde art.
