= Hungarian nationality law =

Hungary Citizenship Act

Parliament of Hungary
- Long title: An Act relating to Hungarian citizenship
- Enacted by: Government of Hungary
- Status: Current legislation

Hungarian nationality law is based on the principles of jus sanguinis. Hungarian citizenship can be acquired by descent from a Hungarian parent, or by naturalisation. A person born in Hungary to foreign parents does not generally acquire Hungarian citizenship. A Hungarian citizen is also a citizen of the European Union.

The basic principles for the acquisition of Hungarian citizenship are laid down in Article G) of the Fundamental Law, while the detailed rules are laid down in Act LV of 1993 on Hungarian Citizenship (commonly abbreviated as Ápt.). By changes made in January 2011, every person who was a Hungarian citizen or a descendant of a person who was a Hungarian citizen before 1920 (only the Kingdom of Hungary, part of the Austro-Hungarian Empire, is eligible) or between 1941 and 1945 and speaks Hungarian may apply to become a Hungarian citizen, even if they do not live in Hungary.

Dual citizenship is permitted under Hungarian law.

== Citizenship by birth and adoption ==
A person acquires Hungarian citizenship at birth if at least one parent is a Hungarian citizen. The place of birth is irrelevant.

Children born in Hungary to foreign parents do not acquire Hungarian citizenship at birth unless they would otherwise be stateless.

Minor children adopted by Hungarian citizens may apply and would normally be granted Hungarian citizenship.

== Naturalization as a Hungarian citizen ==
Persons may apply to be naturalized as a Hungarian citizen after 8 years continuous residence in Hungary if they:

- have no criminal past at all,
- have a stable livelihood,
- are of good character, and
- pass a test in basic constitutional studies.

Persons may apply to be naturalized after 5 years residence in Hungary if they were:

- born in Hungary, or
- established residence in Hungary before age 18, or
- are stateless.

Persons may apply to be naturalized after 3 years residence in Hungary if they are:

- spouses of Hungarian citizens who have been married for three years (or who are widows or widowers),
- parents of Hungarian citizen minor children,
- persons adopted by Hungarian citizens, or
- recognised refugees.

Persons may apply to be naturalized if they are:

- spouses of Hungarian citizens who have been married for at least ten years, or
- spouses of Hungarian citizens who have been married for at least five years and they have a child together counting the 5 years from when the child was born, and
- able to provide proof of proficiency in the Hungarian language.

Applicants aged 60 or over, those of diminished capacity, and persons holding a Hungarian language diploma (from a Hungarian institution) may be exempted the constitutional studies requirement.

== Citizenship by ancestry ==
The Hungarian citizenship law of 2011 allows ethnic Hungarians to apply for simplified naturalisation if they can speak Hungarian and provide evidence of Hungarian ancestry. A person may apply for simplified naturalisation if the applicant is a descendant of a person who was a Hungarian citizen before 1920 (only the Kingdom of Hungary, part of the Austro-Hungarian Empire, is eligible) or between 1941 and 1945 and the applicant speaks Hungarian. They may become a Hungarian citizen even if they do not live in Hungary.

The law has created controversy as some five million ethnic Hungarians living beyond Hungary's borders, mostly in Romania, Slovakia, Serbia and Ukraine, may claim Hungarian citizenship. There are Hungarians living in Slovakia, Serbia, Ukraine, Romania, and Austria whose ancestors lost Hungarian citizenship as a result of the peace treaty ending World War I.

By December 2019, more than 1,100,000 applications had been filed and over 950,000 people had been granted citizenship. The main sources of applicants were 650,000 from Transylvania (Romania), 150,000 from Vojvodina (Serbia) and 120,000 from Ukraine.

== Hungarian citizenship by declaration ==
Declaration is a simplified form of naturalisation. The following people may be eligible to acquire Hungarian citizenship by declaration:

- persons who lost Hungarian citizenship through emigration between 15 September 1947 and 2 May 1990.
- Stateless persons aged less than 19, born in Hungary and residing in Hungary for the 5 years prior to the declaration.

== Oath of allegiance ==
Persons becoming naturalised Hungarian citizens are expected to take an Oath of Allegiance as follows:

"I swear that I regard Hungary as my country. I will be a faithful citizen of the Republic of Hungary. I will respect and obey the Constitution and laws of this country. I defend my country to the utmost of my strength, I serve it to the best of my abilities. So help me God".

Those who prefer may take an equivalent solemn promise instead of an oath.

== Loss of Hungarian citizenship ==
It is not possible for a person to lose Hungarian citizenship involuntarily. The exception concerns fraudulent applications for naturalisation (subject to a 20-year time bar after which action cannot be taken).

A 2019 court case showed that loss of language skill — even if it was at a sufficient level at the time citizenship was granted — is considered by the Hungarian government as a violation of Simplified Naturalisation terms. However, the court ruled in favour of the defendant, who was able to retain their citizenship by demonstrating that language skill erodes without the ability to practice.

Hungarian citizens who hold another nationality and live outside Hungary may renounce their Hungarian citizenship.

== Citizenship of the European Union ==
Because Hungary forms part of the European Union, Hungarian citizens are also citizens of the European Union under European Union law and thus enjoy rights of free movement and have the right to vote in elections for the European Parliament. When in a non-EU country where there is no Hungarian embassy, Hungarian citizens have the right to get consular protection from the embassy of any other EU country present in that country. Hungarian citizens can live and work in any country within the EU as a result of the right of free movement and residence granted in Article 21 of the EU Treaty.

== Travel freedom of Hungarian citizens ==
Visa requirements for Hungarian citizens

Visa requirements for Hungarian citizens are administrative entry restrictions by the authorities of other states placed on citizens of Hungary. As of May 2018, Hungarian citizens had visa-free or visa on arrival access to 180 countries and territories, ranking the Hungarian passport 9th in terms of travel freedom according to the Henley Passport Index.

In 2017, the Hungarian nationality is ranked eighteenth in Nationality Index (QNI). This index differs from the Visa Restrictions Index, which focuses on external factors including travel freedom. The QNI considers, in addition, to travel freedom on internal factors such as peace & stability, economic strength, and human development as well.

== See also ==
- Citizenship Act (Slovakia)
