= Julius Theodor Grunert =

German forester (1809–1889)

Julius Theodor Grunert (31 January 1809, in Halle an der Saale – 30 August 1889, in Trier) was a German forester.

He received his education at the University of Halle and the Forestry Academy in Eberswalde. In 1839 he became a lecturer at the Agricultural Academy in Eldena, and later on, worked in various roles in the forestry service at Neu-Glienicke (from 1843), Danzig (from 1846) and Köslin (from 1849). In 1851 he returned to Danzig, where in 1854 he received the title of Oberforstmeister (upper forestry manager). In 1859 he was appointed successor to Friedrich Wilhelm Leopold Pfeil as director of the Forestry Academy in Eberswalde. He remained as director at Eberswalde up until 1866, when he was replaced by Bernhard Danckelmann. From 1866 to 1878 he served as Oberforstmeister in Trier.

From 1861 to 1867 he worked as editor of the journal Forstliche Blätter, and after a hiatus of several years, continued its edition in collaboration with Ottomar Victor Leo (1872–76) and Bernard Borggreve (1877–89). His book on forestry lessons for beginners was published over several editions, being titled Forstlehre. Unterricht im forstwesen für forstlehrlinge und angehende förster (2 volumes, 4th edition 1889). Another noted work by Grunert was a book on hunter education, called Jagdlehre, Unterricht im Jagdwesen für angehende Jäger, (2 volumes, 1879–80).
