= Pubs Code etc. Regulations 2016 =

UK Statutory Instrument

- Statutory Instrument
- Parliament of the United Kingdom
- Citation: SI 2016/790
- Territorial extent: England and Wales

Dates
- Made: 20 July 2016
- Commencement: 21 July 2016
Other legislation
Made under	Small Business, Enterprise and Employment Act 2015

Text of statute as originally enacted

The Pubs Code etc. Regulations 2016 (SI 2016/790) were introduced by the UK Government as part of the Small Business Enterprise and Employment Act 2015. The code was passed on 14 June 2016 and implemented on 21 July 2016.

The code regulates the relationship between pub tenants and the large pub owning companies, known as pubcos. A pubco rents out a pub to a tenant and then sells them the pub's supplies, known as tied products. This makes the pub what is called a tied house. The tenant is obligated to buy these supplies from the pubco.

The code establishes the right of a tied tenant to take a free of tie rent option at certain trigger points, known as the Market Rent Only (MRO) option. The code also mandates that the affected pubcos must provide information to new tenants on how the landlord/tenant relationship is conducted.

The code applies only to tenants of pubcos owning over 500 pubs. The regulated pubcos in 2015 were:

- Greene King (including Spirit Pub Company which they own)
- Marston's
- Star Pubs & Bars, a part of Heineken International
- Admiral Taverns
- Punch Taverns
- Enterprise Inns

== Background ==
It was deemed necessary to regulate the business relationships as an imbalance of power and bad business practices had been identified by several business select committees. They had been investigating the problems since 2004. The evidence proved that the renting of tied pubs was unfair and in need of reform.

A large survey from CGA Strategy showed some two-thirds of tied tenants were earning very little profit from their pubs. Despite clear recommendations by all previous select committees to create statutory powers and re-balance "risk and reward" the government opted for a self-regulatory approach This approach was announced in Nov 2011 by the then Minister and Under Secretary of State Ed Davey MP.

== Self regulation (PIRRS and PICAS) ==
A package of self-regulation was proposed by the pubcos this was to include an Independent Framework Code (IFC) and for all pub companies offering a tied rent to have a company code, a rent review scheme (PIRRS) and a dispute resolution service (PICAS). Despite many previous opportunities the pubcos were unable to create enough meaningful change to the letting of pubs under self-regulation route, the BBPA (pubcos trade body - although Greene King are not members.) did not have the power to effect swift changes despite clear promises to Government that they would.

This was further highlighted during the 2011 BIS select committee:

"The BBPA has shown itself to be impotent in enforcing its own timetable for reform and the supposed threat of removing the membership of pub companies who did not deliver was hollow. The voluntary withdrawal from the BBPA by Greene King, which has suffered no reputational loss as a result, clearly demonstrates that fact."

Six revisions of the Framework Code have been published but none of them made any attempt to ensure that was an equitable split of profits between licensees and pubcos (the no worse off principle). At a meeting of the Parliamentary Save the Pub Group the Chief Executive of the BBPA said "it is not the role of the BBPA to look at tenants’ profit". It was this refusal to consider tenant profitability which underlined the failure of the self-regulatory approach to deliver on key issues. At the same time pressure from campaigning Tenant groups began to gather pace under the Fair Deal for your Local banner and meant further scrutiny from government was inevitable.

== Pubs Advisory Service (PAS) ==
The government also wanted to see the trade create a "pubs advisory service" to help new entrants to the pubs trade with independent advice. The British Institute of Innkeeping, working with the Federation of Licensed Victuallers Associations, was reported in 2012 to be offering access to its Pubs Advisory Service. A rival company operating under the PAS name was created and launched by trade figures in May 2012.

== Government consults again (2013) ==
The government held a new consultation in 2013, once again looking into the relationship between tenants and their pubcos. This time carried out by the Business Innovation and Skills department and not the select committees as had been the case in previous years. The outcome of that consultation was that the Government concluded from over 8000 responses that self-regulation had failed to make enough progress since 2004 (when first offered to the select committee by pubco's) and that a new statutory pubs code was required to address the failures in the sector thereby overturning the policy outlined by Ed Davey back in 2011.

The government opted for a de minimis approach i.e. only those companies with over 1% of the market (500 pubs) would be subject to regulation.

== (MRO) New Clause 2 Nov 2014 ==
The government established in the wake of the consultation two principles for the draft bill

- that a "tied tenant would be no worse off than a free of tie tenant" and
- that the code would be based on "fair and lawful dealing"

The draft bill still had no clear mechanism as to how this would be achieved. MP Greg Mulholland (who had helped lead the Fair Deal for Your Local campaign) proposed a new clause to the draft bill to rectify this, his proposal was called the Market Rent Only option or MRO as it is now commonly referred to.

On 18 November 2014 a vote was called and despite a three line whip the vote turned out to be a historic defeat for government by 284 votes to 259 and New Clause 2 with MRO was added to the Bill.

== Pubs Code Adjudicator (PCA) ==
The Pubs Code requires an Adjudicator and one was appointed by the BIS on 10 March 2016 The current adjudicator is Paul Newby who was a director of Fleurets. His appointment is not without controversy as he previously acted during his time at Fleurets for some of the companies he is now to regulate. Although he also acted for tenants, his case load when he left Fleurets included six cases acting for the pubcos he is to regulate and sevenacting for tenants.

The British Pub Confederation (BPC), which claims to represent more publicans than any other organisation, has said that its members will advise their tenant members not to accept Mr Newby in their cases., whereas the Association of Licensed Multiple Retailers (ALMR) which represents multiple pub operators running about 4,000 tied tenanted pubs has welcomed Mr Newby's appointment. Following two sessions of oral evidence firstly from Mr Newby, then in a joint session of representatives from Punch, Enterprise, the PAS and the BPC, the BIS committee wrote to the Secretary of State for Business, Energy and Industrial Strategy on 21 July 2016 calling for Mr Newby to be replaced on the grounds of a perception in tenants' eyes of conflict of interest. No evidence was taken from the ALMR. On the same date the Adjudicator published his conflict of interest policy and register of interests. A spokesman for the Adjudicator was quoted in the Morning Advertiser (a trade journal) on 1 August 2016 as saying that the Commissioner for Public Appointments had reviewed the case and was satisfied that the appointments panel was correct to conclude that there were no conflicts of interest which would prevent Mr Newby from doing the job. The Minister is yet to respond.

== Pubs Code in Scotland ==
Becomes an act:

The Pubs Code regulation does not apply to tenants of the large pub-owning companies if the pub they rent is in Scotland however a new Scottish bill proposes a code which will go further than the English and Welsh code. During the introduction of legislation in England and Wales, the Scottish government undertook a separate consultation with the outcome showing that unlike in other parts of the United Kingdom, no one pub model in Scotland is significantly advantaged over another and in turn, no legislative action was required. This changed in 2020 and The FSB said in its response "against this context, the Scottish Government’s commissioned research on the pub sector, which found that no part of the sector was ‘unfairly disadvantaged’, seems insufficient grounds to rule out legislative action"

The Law Society of Scotland said in its response when looking at competition grounds "that where the operating model of a pub tenancy arrangement is such that effective wholesale prices of beer and other products are driven significantly above market value, the cost may be borne by consumers".

A few pub companies in Scotland have signed up to a voluntary code arranged by its membership organisation the BBPA which forms a concession made to tied tenants, it is not a universal offer as not all tied pub companies in Scotland signed up to a code, the SBPA (Scottish Beer and Pub Association) launched its version in 2016 which its members publish. Previously, the voluntary code was managed by the GB-wide Pubs Governing Body (PGB).

On 27 November 2020 the Tied Pubs Bill passed stage one by a huge majority, 107 for 0 against, and the Scottish Minister Jamie Hepburn announced during the debate that the Scots Government would now be backing the bill.

The Tied Pubs (Scotland) Act 2021 (asp 17) passed the Scottish Parliament by a vote of 111 for, 0 against and 0 abstentions. It became law on 5 May 2021. The Scottish Government consulted on the creation of the actual code wording, and the Code is now set out in the Scottish Pubs Code Regulations 2024.

== Sustainable business plans ==
The Code introduces a mandatory requirement for business plans with the intention being to stop unachievable business models from being used in the letting of tied public houses.

The regulations place the onus upon any pub company letting a tied pub to ensure the business plan presented by a prospective tenant is sustainable. It requires that any reports of the trading costs and other relevant data for tied pubs are being supplied upfront.
