= List of statutory instruments of the United Kingdom, 2016 =

This is a list of statutory instruments made in the United Kingdom in the year 2016.

== 1–100 ==
Number	Title
1	The Legal Aid, Sentencing and Punishment of Offenders Act 2012 (Alcohol Abstinence and Monitoring Requirements) Piloting (Amendment) Order 2016
2	The Special Educational Needs and Disability (First-tier Tribunal Recommendation Power) (Pilot) (Amendment) Regulations 2016
3	The A483 Trunk Road (Welshpool Bypass, Powys) (Temporary Prohibition of Vehicles) Order 2016
4	The A489 Trunk Road (Newtown to Caersws, Powys) (Temporary Speed Restrictions & No Overtaking) Order 2016
5	The A44 Trunk Road (Llangurig, Powys to Aberystwyth, Ceredigion) (Temporary Speed Restrictions & No Overtaking) Order 2016
6	The Education Workforce Council (Main Functions) (Wales) (Amendment) Regulations 2016
7	The M4 Motorway (Junction 46, Llangyfelach, Swansea to Junction 49, Pont Abraham, Carmarthenshire) (Temporary Prohibitions, 50 MPH Speed Limit and Trafficking of Hard Shoulder) Order 2016
8	The Air Navigation (Restriction of Flying) (Cheltenham Festival) Regulations 2016
9	The Immigration (Residential Accommodation) (Prescribed Requirements and Codes of Practice) (Amendment) Order 2016
10	The Criminal Justice Act 2003 (Alcohol Abstinence and Monitoring Requirement) (Prescription of Arrangement for Monitoring) (Amendment) Order 2016
11	The Immigration Act 2014 (Commencement No. 6) Order 2016
12	The Value Added Tax (Section 55A) (Specified Services and Excepted Supplies) Order 2016
13	The Air Navigation (Restriction of Flying) (Royal Air Force Cosford) Regulations 2016
14	The Air Navigation (Restriction of Flying) (Royal Air Force Scampton) (Restricted Zone EG R313) Regulations 2016
15	The Public Lending Right Scheme 1982 (Commencement of Variation) Order 2016
16	The Individual Savings Account (Amendment) Regulations 2016
17	The East Midlands Gateway Rail Freight Interchange and Highway Order 2016
18	The Strategic Planning (Composition of Panels and Qualifying Expenditure) (Wales) Regulations 2016
19	The A5 Trunk Road (Llangollen, Denbighshire) (Temporary Traffic Prohibitions & Restrictions) Order 2016
20	The Licensing Act 2003 (Permitted Temporary Activities) (Notices) (Amendment) Regulations 2016
21	The Onshore Wind Generating Stations (Exemption) (England and Wales) Order 2016
22	The A470 Trunk Road (Powys/Merthyr Tydfil County Boundary to Builth Wells, Powys) (Temporary Speed Restrictions & No Overtaking) Order 2016
23	The Diocese of York (Educational Endowments) (St. Barnabas Church of England Voluntary Controlled Primary School (formerly St. Paul's Foundry)) Order 2016
24	The Greater London Authority Elections (Amendment) Rules 2016
25	The Air Navigation (Restriction of Flying) (Jet Formation Display Teams) Regulations 2016
26	The Air Navigation (Restriction of Flying) (Abingdon Air and Country Show) Regulations 2016
27	The Education Workforce Council (Registration Fees) (Wales) Regulations 2016
28	The Town and Country Planning (Use Classes) (Amendment) (Wales) Order 2016
29	The Town and Country Planning (General Permitted Development) (Amendment) (Wales) Order 2016
30	The Judicial Pensions (Contributions) (Amendment) Regulations 2016
31	The Non-Domestic Rating (Definition of Domestic Property) (Wales) Order 2016
32	The Non-Domestic Rating (Small Business Relief) (Wales) (Amendment) Order 2016
33	The Welfare Reform Act 2012 (Commencement No. 26 and Transitional and Transitory Provisions and Commencement No. 22, 23 and 24 and Transitional and Transitory Provisions (Modification)) Order 2016
34	The Liberia (Asset-Freezing) (Revocation) Regulations 2016
35	The Police and Criminal Evidence Act 1984 (Codes of Practice) (Revision of Code E) Order 2016
36	The Iran (European Union Financial Sanctions) Regulations 2016
37	The Regulation of Investigatory Powers (Interception of Communications: Code of Practice) Order 2016
38	The Equipment Interference (Code of Practice) Order 2016
39	The Pensions Act 2014 (Pension Sharing on Divorce etc.) (Transitional Provision) Order 2016
40	The A458 Trunk Road (East of Middletown to Nant-y-Dugoed, Powys) (Temporary Speed Restrictions & No Overtaking) Order 2016
41	The A494 Trunk Road (Exit Slip Roads at Queensferry Interchange, Flintshire) (Temporary Prohibition of Vehicles, Cyclists & Pedestrians) Order 2016
42	The A483 Trunk Road (Newtown to Llanymynech, Powys) (Temporary Speed Restrictions & No Overtaking) Order 2016
43	The A449 and A40 Trunk Roads (Usk to Raglan, Monmouthshire) (Temporary Traffic Prohibitions & Restrictions) Order 2016
44	The Enforcement by Deduction from Accounts (Imposition of Charges by Deposit-takers) Regulations 2016
45	The Libya (European Union Financial Sanctions) Regulations 2016
46	The A470 Trunk Road (Builth Wells to Llangurig, Powys) (Temporary Speed Restrictions & No Overtaking) Order 2016
47	The A4042 Trunk Road (Little Mill, West of Usk, Monmouthshire) (Temporary Prohibition of Left and Right Hand Turns) Order 2016
48	The Cancellation of Student Loans for Living Costs Liability (Wales) Regulations 2016
49	The National Grid (Hinkley Point C Connection Project) Order 2016
50	The Council Tax Reduction Schemes (Prescribed Requirements and Default Scheme) (Wales) (Amendment) Regulations 2016
51	The National Health Service (Mandate Requirements) Regulations 2016
52	The Planning (Wales) Act 2015 (Commencement No. 3 and Transitional Provisions) Order 2016
53	The Developments of National Significance (Specified Criteria and Prescribed Secondary Consents) (Wales) Regulations 2016
54	The Developments of National Significance (Application of Enactments) (Wales) Order 2016
55	The Developments of National Significance (Procedure) (Wales) Order 2016
56	The Developments of National Significance (Wales) Regulations 2016
57	The Developments of National Significance (Fees) (Wales) Regulations 2016
58	The Town and Country Planning (Environmental Impact Assessment) (Wales) Regulations 2016
59	The Town and Country Planning (Development Management Procedure) (Wales) (Amendment) Order 2016
60	The Town and Country Planning (Validation Appeals Procedure) (Wales) Regulations 2016
61	The Town and Country Planning (Pre-Application Services) (Wales) Regulations 2016
62	The Town and Country Planning (Fees for Applications, Deemed Applications and Site Visits) (Wales) (Amendment) Regulations 2016
63	The Employment Allowance (Increase of Maximum Amount) Regulations 2016
64	The Dorset (Electoral Changes) Order 2016
65	The Exeter (Electoral Changes) Order 2016
66	The A470 Trunk Road (Pontypridd to Abercynon, Rhondda Cynon Taf) (Temporary Traffic Prohibitions & Restrictions) Order 2016
67	The Andrey Lugovoy and Dmitri Kovtun Freezing Order 2016
68	The National Minimum Wage (Amendment) Regulations 2016
69	The European Union Referendum Act 2015 (Commencement) Regulations 2016
70	The Administrative Forfeiture of Cash (Forfeiture Notices) (Northern Ireland) Regulations 2016
71	The Diocese of Lichfield (Educational Endowments) (The Former Norton Canes National School) Order 2016
72	The Diocese of Leeds (Educational Endowments) (Aysgarth Church of England School) Order 2016
73	The A19/A1058 Coast Road (Junction Improvement) Development Consent Order 2016
74	The Finance Act 2014, Schedule 9 (Consequential Amendment) Regulations 2016
75	The Mostyn Docks Harbour Revision Order 2016
76	The Sheep and Goats (Records, Identification and Movement) (England) (Amendment) Order 2016
77	The Education (Student Support) (Wales) (Amendment) Regulations 2016
78	The Reservoirs Act 1975 (Exemptions, Appeals and Inspections) (Wales) Regulations 2016
79	The Flood and Water Management Act 2010 (Commencement No. 1 and Transitional Provisions) (Wales) Order 2016
80	The Reservoirs Act 1975 (Capacity, Registration, Prescribed Forms, etc.) (Wales) Regulations 2016
81	The Health and Social Care Act 2012 (Commencement No. 10) Order 2016
82	The Pension Protection Fund and Occupational Pension Schemes (Levy Ceiling and Compensation Cap) Order 2016
83	The Air Navigation (Restriction of Flying) (Trooping the Colour) Regulations 2016
84	The Local Authorities (Model Code of Conduct) (Wales) (Amendment) Order 2016
85	The Local Government (Standards Committees, Investigations, Dispensations and Referral) (Wales) (Amendment) Regulations 2016
86	The Well-being of Future Generations (Wales) Act 2015 (Commencement No. 2) Order 2016
87	The Child Minding and Day Care (Wales) (Amendment) Regulations 2016
88	The Childcare Act 2006 (Local Authority Assessment) (Wales) Regulations 2016
89	The Government Resources and Accounts Act 2000 (Alteration of Timetables for Accounts) Order 2016
90	The National Health Service (Primary Medical Services and Primary Dental Services) (Wales) (Amendment and Transitional Provision) Regulations 2016
91	The Planning (Listed Buildings and Conservation Areas) (Wales) (Amendment) Regulations 2016
92	The Legal Services Act 2007 (Claims Management Complaints) (Fees) (Amendment) Regulations 2016
93	The Air Navigation (Restriction of Flying) (East Fortune) Regulations 2016
94	The Air Navigation (Restriction of Flying) (Hylands Park) Regulations 2016
95	The Public Service Pensions Revaluation (Earnings) Order 2016
96	The Child Minding and Day Care Exceptions (Wales) (Amendment) Order 2016
97	The National Health Service (Welfare Reform Consequential Amendments) (Wales) Regulations 2016
98	The Regulation of Child Minding and Day Care (Wales) Order 2016
99	The Tax Avoidance Schemes (Prescribed Descriptions of Arrangements) (Amendment) Regulations 2016
100	The Public Health Wales National Health Service Trust (Membership and Procedure) (Amendment) Regulations 2016

== 101–200 ==
Number	Title
101	The National Health Service (Performers Lists) (Wales) (Amendment) Regulations 2016
102	The Local Authorities (Capital Finance and Accounting) (Wales) (Amendment) Regulations 2016
103	The A494 Trunk Road (Mold Bypass, Flintshire) (Temporary Speed Restrictions & No Overtaking) Order 2016
104	The Plant Health (England) (Amendment) Order 2016
105	The Self-build and Custom Housebuilding (Register) Regulations 2016
106	The Seed Potatoes (Wales) Regulations 2016
107	The Agricultural Wages (Wales) Order 2016
108	The Air Navigation (Restriction of Flying) (Wimbledon) Regulations 2016
109	The Air Navigation (Restriction of Flying) (Northampton Sywell) Regulations 2016
110	The Higher Education (Wales) Act 2015 (Commencement No. 2) Order 2016
111	The Special Guardianship (Amendment) Regulations 2016
112	The Watford (Electoral Changes) Order 2016
113	The Self-build and Custom Housebuilding Act 2015 (Commencement) Regulations 2016
114	The NRAM plc (formerly Northern Rock plc) Consequential and Supplementary Provisions Order 2016
115	The Warrington (Electoral Changes) Order 2016
116	The Welwyn Hatfield (Electoral Changes) Order 2016
117	The Social Security (Contributions) (Amendment) Regulations 2016
118	The Smoke-free Premises etc. (Wales) (Amendment) Regulations 2016
119	The A487 Trunk Road (Pembrokeshire/Ceredigion County Boundary, Near Cardigan to Aberaeron, Ceredigion) (Temporary Speed Restrictions and No Overtaking) Order 2016
120	The Criminal Procedure (Amendment) Rules 2016
121	The A40 Trunk Road (Glangrwyney to Pont Wen, Halfway, Powys) (Temporary Speed Restrictions and No Overtaking) Order 2016
122	The A55 Trunk Road (Conwy Tunnel, Conwy) (Temporary Traffic Prohibitions a Restrictions) Order 2016
123	The A487 Trunk Road (Aberystwyth, Ceredigion to the Powys/Gwynedd County Boundary at Dyfi Bridge, Powys) (Temporary Speed Restrictions and No Overtaking) Order 2016
124	The Legislative Reform (Exempt Lotteries) Order 2016
125	The A487 Trunk Road (Aberaeron to Aberystwyth, Ceredigion) (Temporary Speed Restrictions and No Overtaking) Order 2016
126	The Competition Act 1998 (Public Transport Ticketing Schemes Block Exemption) (Amendment) Order 2016
127	The Wildlife and Countryside Act 1981 (England and Wales) (Amendment) Regulations 2016
128	The A483 Trunk Road (Powys/Carmarthenshire Border to Llandrindod Wells, Powys) (Temporary Speed Restrictions & No Overtaking) Order 2016
129	The A4042 Trunk Road (Crown Roundabout to Mamhilad Roundabout, Torfaen) (Temporary Traffic Prohibitions & Restrictions) Order 2016
130	The A487 Trunk Road (Pwllgoleulas, Gwynedd) (40 mph Speed Limit) Order 2016
131	UKSI number withdrawn
132	The Air Navigation (Restriction of Flying) (Supporting Syria and the Regions Conference) (London) Regulations 2016
133	The Air Navigation (Restriction of Flying) (Stonehenge) Regulations 2016
134	The Air Navigation (Restriction of Flying) (Duxford) Regulations 2016
135	The Education (Amendments Relating to the Intervals for Inspection of Education and Training) (Wales) Regulations 2016
136	The Companies Act 2006 (Amendment of Part 21A) Regulations 2016
137	The Government of Maintained Schools (Training Requirements for Governors) (Wales) (Amendment) Regulations 2016
138	The Water Environment (Water Framework Directive) (England and Wales) (Amendment) Regulations 2016
139	The Water Environment (Water Framework Directive) (Northumbria and Solway Tweed River Basin Districts) (Amendment) Regulations 2016
140	UKSI number withdrawn
141	The Football Spectators (2016 European Championship Control Period) Order 2016
142	The Social Services Codes (Appointed Day) (Wales) Order 2016
143	The Non-Domestic Rating (Small Business Rate Relief) (England) (Amendment) Order 2016
144	The Air Navigation (Restriction of Flying) (RNAS Yeovilton) Regulations 2016
145	The Air Navigation (Restriction of Flying) (RNAS Culdrose) Regulations 2016
146	The Central Rating List (England) (Amendment) Regulations 2016
147	The Policing and Crime Act 2009 (Commencement No. 11 and Transitional Provisions and Savings) Order 2016
148	The Serious Crime Act 2015 (Commencement No. 5 and Transitional Provisions and Savings) Regulations 2016
149	The Environmental Permitting (England and Wales) (Amendment) Regulations 2016
150	The Pollution Prevention and Control (Designation) (England and Wales) Order 2016
151	The Newhaven Harbour Revision Order 2016
152	The Air Navigation (Restriction of Flying) (Jet Formation Display Teams) (No. 2) Regulations 2016
153	The Personal Injuries (NHS Charges) (Amounts) Amendment Regulations 2016
154	The Commissioner for Older People in Wales (Appointment) (Amendment) Regulations 2016
155	The Air Navigation (Isle of Man) (Amendment) Order 2016
156	The Immigration (Isle of Man) (Amendment) Order 2016
157	The Social Security (Reciprocal Agreement) (Isle of Man) Order 2016
158	The Social Security (Reciprocal Agreements) Order 2016
159	The National Assembly for Wales Commission (Crown Status) Order 2016
160	The Northern Ireland Act 1998 (Modification) Order 2016
161	The European Communities (Designation) Order 2016
162	The Transfer of Functions (Fire and Rescue Services) Order 2016
163	The Financial Services (Banking Reform) Act 2013 (Consequential Amendments) Order 2016
164	The Elections (Policy Development Grants Scheme) (Amendment) Order 2016
165	Byelaws (Alternative Procedure) (England) Regulations 2016
166	The Palm Paper Mill Generating Station Order 2016
167	The Care and Support (Direct Payments) (Amendment) Regulations 2016
168	The A55 Trunk Road (Westbound On-Slip Road, Junction 19, Glan Conwy Interchange, Conwy County Borough) (Temporary Prohibition of Vehicles) Order 2016
169	The A5 Trunk Road (East of Waterloo Bridge, Betws-y-Coed, Conwy County Borough) (Temporary Speed Restrictions and No Overtaking) Order 2016
170	The A487 Trunk Road (Blaenplwyf to Llanfarian, Ceredigion) (Temporary Traffic Prohibition & Restrictions) Order 2016
171	The A40 Trunk Road (Elms Over-bridge to the Wales/England Border, Monmouthshire) (Temporary Traffic Prohibitions & Restrictions) Order 2016
172	The A489 Trunk Road (Cemmaes Road to Machynlleth, Powys) (Temporary Speed Restrictions and No Overtaking) Order 2016
173	The Housing Act 1985 (Amendment of Schedule 2A) (Serious Offences) (Wales) Order 2016
174	The Air Navigation (Restriction of Flying) (Her Majesty The Queen's Birthday Flypast) (Rehearsals) Regulations 2016
175	The Air Navigation (Restriction of Flying) (Torbay) Regulations 2016
176	The Air Navigation (Restriction of Flying) (Sunderland) Regulations 2016
177	The Immigration and Nationality (Fees) Order 2016
178	The Duty of Letting Agents to Publicise Fees (Exclusion) (Wales) Regulations 2016
179	The Education (Designated Institutions) (England) Order 2016
180	The Insolvent Companies (Reports on Conduct of Directors) (England and Wales) Rules 2016
181	The Water Supply and Sewerage Licences (Cross-Border Applications) Regulations 2016
182	The Welsh Language Standards (No. 2) Regulations 2016
183	The Welsh Language (Wales) Measure 2011 (Amendment of Schedule 6) Order 2016
184	The Insolvency Proceedings (Fees) (Amendment) Order 2016
185	The Insolvent Companies (Reports on Conduct of Directors) (Scotland) Rules 2016
186	The Human Medicines (Amendment) Regulations 2016
187	The Insolvency (Amendment) Rules 2016
188	The Council Tax (Demand Notices) (England) (Amendment) Regulations 2016
189	The Personal Independence Payment (Transitional Provisions) Regulations 2016
190	The Medicines (Products for Human Use) (Fees) Regulations 2016
191	The Enterprise and Regulatory Reform Act 2013 (Commencement No. 9 and Saving Provisions) Order 2016
192	The A470 Trunk Road (Moat Lane Level Crossing, Caersws, Powys) (Temporary Prohibition of Vehicles) Order 2016
193	The A470 & A494 Trunk Roads (Dolgellau Bypass, Gwynedd) (Temporary Speed Restrictions & No Overtaking) Order 2016
194	The A5 Trunk Road (West of Pentrefoelas, Conwy County Borough) (Temporary Speed Restrictions & No Overtaking) Order 2016
195	The A5 Trunk Road (Pentre Du, Betws-y-Coed, Conwy County Borough) (Temporary Part-time 20 mph Speed Limit) Order 2016
196	The A470 Trunk Road (Nantddu, Powys) (Temporary Prohibition of Vehicles) Order 2016
197	The A4042 Trunk Road (Grove Park Roundabout, Newport to Crown Roundabout, Torfaen) (Temporary Prohibition of Vehicles) Order 2016
198	The Postgraduate Medical Education and Training (Amendment) Order of Council 2016
199	The State Pension and Occupational Pension Schemes (Miscellaneous Amendments) Regulations 2016
200	The Pensions Act 2014 (Abolition of Contracting-out for Salary Related Pension Schemes) (Consequential Amendments and Savings) Order 2016

== 201–300 ==
Number	Title
201	UKSI number withdrawn
202	The Financial Services (Banking Reform) Act 2013 (Designated Representative Bodies) Order 2016
203	The Pensions Act 2014 (Commencement No.8) Order 2016
204	The School Governance (Constitution and Federations) (England) (Amendment) Regulations 2016
205	The Social Security Revaluation of Earnings Factors Order 2016
206	The Deregulation Act 2015 (Commencement No. 5) Order 2016
207	The Proceeds of Crime Act 2002 (Search, Seizure and Detention of Property: Code of Practice) (England and Wales) (No. 2) Order 2016
208	The Proceeds of Crime Act 2002 (Cash Searches: Code of Practice) Order 2016
209	The Proceeds of Crime Act 2002 (Investigations: Code of Practice) (England and Wales and Northern Ireland) Order 2016
210	The Proceeds of Crime Act 2002 (Search, Seizure and Detention of Property: Code of Practice) (Northern Ireland) Order 2016
211	The Social Services and Well-being (Wales) Act 2014 (Consequential Amendments) (Secondary Legislation) Regulations 2016
212	The Coroners and Justice Act 2009 (Alteration of Coroner Areas) Order 2016
213	The Access to the Countryside (Coastal Margin) (Brean Down to Minehead) Order 2016
214	The National Health Service Trust Development Authority (Directions and Miscellaneous Amendments etc.) Regulations 2016
215	The Universal Credit (Surpluses and Self-employed Losses) (Change of coming into force) Regulations 2016
216	The Social Services and Well-being (Wales) Act 2014 (Consequential Amendments) and Care Planning, Placement and Case Review (Miscellaneous Amendments) (Wales) Regulations 2016
217	The Common Agricultural Policy (Amendment) (No. 2) (Wales) Regulations 2016
218	UKSI number withdrawn
219	European Union Referendum (Conduct) Regulations 2016
220	The European Union Referendum (Welsh Forms) Order 2016
221	The Collective Management of Copyright (EU Directive) Regulations 2016
222	The Proceeds of Crime Act 2002 (Investigative Powers of Prosecutors: Code of Practice) (England and Wales and Northern Ireland) Order 2016
223	The Higher Education (Fee and Access Plans) (Notices, Procedure and Publication) (Wales) Regulations 2016
224	The Pensions Act 2014 (Consequential and Supplementary Amendments) Order 2016
225	The Undertakings for Collective Investment in Transferable Securities Regulations 2016
226	The Immigration and Nationality (Fees) Regulations 2016
227	The State Pension (Amendment) Regulations 2016
228	The Social Security (Fees Payable by Qualifying Lenders) (Amendment) Regulations 2016
229	The Occupational Pension Schemes (Requirement to obtain Audited Accounts and a Statement from the Auditor) (Amendment) Regulations 2016
230	The Social Security Benefits Up-rating Order 2016
231	The Occupational and Personal Pension Schemes (Modification of Schemes – Miscellaneous Amendments) Regulations 2016
232	The Universal Credit (Transitional Provisions) (Amendment) Regulations 2016
233	The Social Security (Scottish Rate of Income Tax etc.) (Amendment) Regulations 2016
234	The Civil Procedure (Amendment) Rules 2016
235	The Value Added Tax (Refund of Tax to Museums and Galleries) (Amendment) Order 2016
236	The Qualifications Wales Act 2015 (Consequential Amendments) Regulations 2016
237	The Taxes (Base Erosion and Profit Shifting) (Country-by-Country Reporting) Regulations 2016
238	The Further Education Loans (Amendment) Regulations 2016
239	The Gambling Act 2005 (Incidental Lotteries) Regulations 2016
240	The State Pension (Amendment) (No. 2) Regulations 2016
241	The Producer Responsibility Obligations (packaging waste) (Miscellaneous Amendments) Regulations 2016
242	The Social Security Benefits (Adjustment of Amounts and Thresholds) Regulations 2016
243	The Modern Slavery Act 2015 (Commencement No. 4) Regulations 2016
244	The Modern Slavery Act 2015 (Consequential Amendments) Regulations 2016
245	The National Health Service Pension Scheme, Injury Benefits and Additional Voluntary Contributions (Amendment) Regulations 2016
246	The Social Security Benefits Up-rating Regulations 2016
247	The Spring Traps Approval (Variation) (England) Order 2016
248	The Passenger and Goods Vehicles (Tachographs) (Amendment) Regulations 2016
249	The Care Quality Commission (Fees) (Reviews and Performance Assessments) Regulations 2016
250	The Dover Harbour (Constitution) Revision Order 2016
251	The Air Navigation (Restriction of Flying) (Didcot) Regulations 2016
252	The Pensions Act 2014 (Contributions Equivalent Premium) (Consequential Provision) and (Savings) (Amendment) Order 2016
253	The Health and Safety and Nuclear (Fees) Regulations 2016
254	The Plant Protection Products (Fees and Charges) (Amendment) Regulations 2016
255	The Agricultural Advisory Panel for Wales (Establishment) Order 2016
256	The A55 Trunk Road (Lay-bys between Junction 2 (Trearddur Bay) & Junction 8 (Llanfair PG), Isle of Anglesey) (Restriction of Waiting) Order 2016
257	The Renewable Heat Incentive Scheme and Domestic Renewable Heat Incentive Scheme (Amendment) Regulations 2016
258	The A470 Trunk Road (Caersws to Cemmaes Road, Powys) (Temporary Speed Restrictions & No Overtaking) Order 2016
259	The A487 Trunk Road (Rhydyfelin to Southgate, Ceredigion) (Temporary Speed Restrictions & No Overtaking) Order 2016
260	The A5 and A470 Trunk Roads (Waterloo Bridge, Near Betws-y-Coed, Conwy) (Temporary Traffic Restrictions and No Overtaking) Order 2016
261	The A494 Trunk Road (Lon Fawr, Ruthin, Denbighshire) (Temporary Traffic Restrictions & Prohibitions) Order 2016
262	The A470 Trunk Road (Cemmaes Road Roundabout to County Border, South of Mallwyd, Powys) (Temporary Speed Restrictions and No Overtaking) Order 2016
263	The A479 Trunk Road (Glanusk Park to Llyswen, Powys) (Temporary Speed Restrictions and No Overtaking) Order 2016
264	The A483 Trunk Road (Junction 5 (Mold Road Interchange), Wrexham County Borough) (Temporary Prohibition of Vehicles) Order 2016
265	The A483 & A489 Trunk Roads (Newtown, Powys) (Temporary Speed Restrictions & No Overtaking) Order 2016
266	The Housing (Wales) Act 2014 (Commencement No. 6) Order 2016
267	The Social Security Benefit (Computation of Earnings) (Amendment) Regulations 2016
268	The Social Security Benefit (Computation of Earnings) (Amendment) (Northern Ireland) Regulations 2016
269	The Merchant Shipping (Light Dues) (Amendment) Regulations 2016
270	The Education (Student Support) (Amendment) Regulations 2016
271	The Employment Tribunals (Constitution and Rules of Procedure) (Amendment) Regulations 2016
272	The National Assembly for Wales (Representation of the People) (Amendment) Order 2016
273	The Concession Contracts Regulations 2016
274	The Utilities Contracts Regulations 2016
275	The Public Procurement (Amendments, Repeals and Revocations) Regulations 2016
276	The Higher Education (Qualifying Courses, Qualifying Persons and Supplementary Provision) (Wales) (Amendment) Regulations 2016
277	The Driving Licences (Exchangeable Licences) Order 2016
278	European Union Referendum (Date of Referendum etc.) Regulations 2016
279	The Control of Noise (Appeals) (Amendment) (England) Regulations 2016
280	The Disease Control (England) (Amendment) Order 2016
281	The Air Navigation (Restriction of Flying) (Cleethorpes) Regulations 2016
282	The Air Navigation (Restriction of Flying) (Northampton Sywell) (No. 2) Regulations 2016
283	The Air Navigation (Restriction of Flying) (Didcot) (Revocation) Regulations 2016
284	The Energy Performance of Buildings (England and Wales) (Amendment) Regulations 2016
285	The Building Regulations &c. (Amendment) Regulations 2016
286	The Legal Aid, Sentencing and Punishment of Offenders Act 2012 (Alcohol Abstinence and Monitoring Requirements) Piloting Order 2016
287	The Social Security (Northern Ireland Reciprocal Arrangements) Regulations 2016
288	The Employment Rights (Increase of Limits) Order 2016
289	The Pension Sharing (Miscellaneous Amendments) Regulations 2016
290	The Recall of MPs Act 2015 (Commencement) Regulations 2016
291	The Proceeds of Crime Act 2002 (Investigations in different parts of the United Kingdom) (Amendment) Order 2016
292	The National Assembly for Wales (Representation of the People) (Amendment) (No. 2) Order 2016
293	The National Health Service Commissioning Board and Clinical Commissioning Groups (Responsibilities and Standing Rules) (Amendment) Regulations 2016
294	The Pension Protection Fund and Occupational and Personal Pension Schemes (Miscellaneous Amendments) Regulations 2016
295	The Recall of MPs Act 2015 (Recall Petition) Regulations 2016
296	The National Health Service (Pharmaceutical and Local Pharmaceutical Services) (Amendment) Regulations 2016
297	The Thorpe Marsh Gas Pipeline Order 2016
298	The National Health Service (Primary Dental Services –Miscellaneous Amendments and Directions to the NHS Business Services Authority) Regulations 2016
299	The European Union Trade Mark Regulations 2016
300	The Police and Crime Commissioner Elections (Amendment) Order 2016

== 301–400 ==
Number	Title
301	The Elmbridge (Electoral Changes) Order 2016
302	The Prior Pursglove and Stockton Sixth Form College (Incorporation) Order 2016
303	The Water Quality and Supply (Fees) Order 2016
304	The Occupational Pension Schemes (Charges and Governance) (Amendment) Regulations 2016
305	The National Health Service (Optical Charges and Payments) (Amendment) (Wales) Regulations 2016
306	The Infrastructure Planning (Onshore Wind Generating Stations) Order 2016
307	The Value Added Tax (Refund of Tax to the Old Oak and Park Royal Development Corporation) Order 2016
308	The Registered Pension Schemes (Provision of Information) (Amendment) Regulations 2016
309	The Offshore Installations (Safety Zones) Order 2016
310	The Armed Forces (Enhanced Learning Credit Scheme and Further and Higher Education Commitment Scheme) (Amendment) Order 2016
311	The Occupational and Personal Pension Schemes (Automatic Enrolment) (Miscellaneous Amendments) Regulations 2016
312	The Children (Secure Accommodation) (Wales) (Amendment) Regulations 2016
313	The Criminal Legal Aid (Remuneration) (Amendment) Regulations 2016
314	The Bathing Water (Amendment) (Wales) Regulations 2016
315	The Explosives Regulations 2014 (Amendment) Regulations 2016
316	The Council Tax and Non-Domestic Rating (Demand Notices) (England) (Amendment) Regulations 2016
317	The Non-Domestic Rating (Designated Areas etc.) Regulations 2016
318	The Oil and Gas Authority (Levy) Regulations 2016
319	The Feed-in Tariffs (Amendment) Order 2016
320	The Ordnance Survey Trading Fund (Revocation) Order 2016
321	The Small Business, Enterprise and Employment Act 2015 (Commencement No. 4, Transitional and Savings Provisions) Regulations 2016
322	His Majesty's Chief Inspector of Education, Children's Services and Skills (Fees and Frequency of Inspections) (Children's Homes etc.) (Amendment) Regulations 2016
323	The Government Resources and Accounts Act 2000 (Estimates and Accounts) Order 2016
324	The National Health Service (Dental Charges) (Amendment) Regulations 2016
325	The National Health Service (Charges and Payments) (Uprating, Miscellaneous Amendments and Transitional Provision) Regulations 2016
326	The Civil Service (Other Crown Servants) Pension Scheme Regulations 2016
327	The Criminal Justice Act 2003 (Alcohol Abstinence and Monitoring Requirement) (Prescription of Arrangement for Monitoring) Order 2016
328	The Tuberculosis (Wales) (Amendment) Order 2016
329	The Income Tax (Pay As You Earn) (Amendment) Regulations 2016
330	The Recovery of Costs (Remand to Youth Detention Accommodation) (Amendment) Regulations 2016
331	The Town and Country Planning (Compensation) (England) (Amendment) Regulations 2016
332	The Town and Country Planning (General Permitted Development) (England) (Amendment) Order 2016
333	The Fees for Payment of Taxes, etc. by Credit Card Regulations 2016
334	The Unauthorised Deposit of Waste (Fixed Penalties) Regulations 2016
335	The Party Wall etc. Act 1996 (Electronic Communications) Order 2016
336	The Hazardous Waste (England and Wales) (Amendment) Regulations 2016
337	The Brechfa Forest West Wind Farm (Amendment) Order 2016
338	The A5 and A483 Trunk Roads (Halton Roundabout, near Chirk, Wrexham County Borough) (Temporary Traffic Restrictions & Prohibitions) Order 2016
339	The Register of People with Significant Control Regulations 2016
340	The Limited Liability Partnerships (Register of People with Significant Control) Regulations 2016
341	The A494 Trunk Road (Nant Clwyd, South of Pwll-glas, Denbighshire) (Temporary Speed Restrictions & No Overtaking) Order 2016
342	The A483 Trunk Road (Llandrindod Wells to Newtown, Powys) (Temporary Speed Restrictions & No Overtaking) Order 2016
343	The Social Security (Contributions) (Limits and Thresholds Amendments and National Insurance Funds Payments) Regulations 2016
344	The Employment Allowance (Excluded Companies) Regulations 2016
345	The Legal Aid, Sentencing and Punishment of Offenders Act 2012 (Commencement No. 12) Order 2016
346	The Air Navigation (Restriction of Flying) (Jet Formation Display Teams) (No. 3) Regulations 2016
347	The Tuberculosis (England) (Amendment) Order 2016
348	The Income Tax (Construction Industry Scheme) (Amendment) Regulations 2016
349	The A479 Trunk Road (Lower Genffordd Bends & Pengenffordd, South of Talgarth, Powys) (Temporary Prohibition of Vehicles) Order 2016
350	The Income Tax (Travel Expenses of Members of Local Authorities etc.) Regulations 2016
351	The Social Services and Well-being (Wales) Act 2014 (Consequential Amendments) (Secondary Legislation) (Amendment) Regulations 2016
352	The Social Security (Contributions) (Amendment) (No. 2) Regulations 2016
353	The Merchant Shipping (Vessels in Commercial Use for Sport or Pleasure) (Amendment) Regulations 2016
354	The Merchant Shipping (Small Workboats and Pilot Boats) (Amendment) Regulations 2016
355	The Family Procedure (Amendment) Rules 2016
356	The Small Business, Enterprise and Employment Act 2015 (Consequential Amendments) (Reports on Conduct of Directors) (Northern Ireland) Regulations 2016
357	The A487 Trunk Road (Braich Goch, Corris, Gwynedd) (Temporary Speed Restrictions & No Overtaking) Order 2016
358	The Developments of National Significance (Specified Criteria and Prescribed Secondary Consents) (Wales) (Amendment) Regulations 2016
359	The Water Resources (Control of Pollution) (Oil Storage) (Wales) Regulations 2016
360	The Tax Credits and Child Benefit (Miscellaneous Amendments) Regulations 2016
361	The Building (Amendment) (Wales) Regulations 2016
362	Traffic Signs Regulations and General Directions 2016
363	The Electricity Supplier Payments (Amendment) Regulations 2016
364	The Individual Savings Account (Amendment No. 2) Regulations 2016
365	The Value Added Tax (Increase of Registration Limits) Order 2016
366	The NHS Foundation Trusts (Trust Funds: Appointment of Trustees) Amendment Order 2016
367	The National Health Service Trusts (Trust Funds: Appointment of Trustees) (Amendment) and Nottingham University Hospitals National Health Service Trust (Trust Funds: Appointment of Trustees) (Revocation) Order 2016
368	The Inspectors of Education, Children's Services and Skills Order 2016
369	The Aviation Security and Piracy (Overseas Territories) (Amendment) Order 2016
370	The Copyright (Cayman Islands) (Amendment) Order 2016
371	The Iran (Sanctions) (Overseas Territories) Order 2016
372	The Pharmacy (Premises Standards, Information Obligations, etc.) Order 2016
373	The Consular Fees (Amendment) Order 2016
374	The Naval, Military and Air Forces Etc. (Disablement and Death) Service Pensions (Amendment) Order 2016
375	The European Public Limited-Liability Company (Register of People with Significant Control) Regulations 2016
376	The Landfill Tax (Amendment) Regulations 2016
377	The M6 Toll Motorway (Junction T6 to M6 Junction 11a, Staffordshire)(Temporary Restriction and Prohibition of Traffic) Order 2016
378	The Iran (United Nations Sanctions) (Amendment) Order 2016
379	The A55 Trunk Road (Eastbound Carriageway between Junction 12 (Tal-y-bont) and Junction 14 (Madryn), Gwynedd) (Temporary Traffic Restrictions & Prohibitions) Order 2016
380	The A487 Trunk Road (South of Llanon, Ceredigion) (Temporary Prohibition of Vehicles) Order 2016
381	The A55 Trunk Road (Junction 24 (Faenol Interchange), Conwy to Junction 27 (Talardy Interchange), Denbighshire) (Temporary Prohibition of Vehicles, Cyclists & Pedestrians) Order 2016
382	The A470 Trunk Road (South of Carno to Clatter, Powys) (Temporary Prohibition of Wide Vehicles) Order 2016
383	The A5 & A494 Trunk Roads (West of Corwen, Denbighshire to West of Padog, Conwy County Borough) (Temporary Traffic Prohibitions & Restriction) Order 2016
384	The Onshore Hydraulic Fracturing (Protected Areas) Regulations 2016
385	The A5 Trunk Road (Pentre Du, Betws-y-Coed, Conwy County Borough) (40 mph Speed Limit) Order 2016
386	The Animal Feed (Composition, Marketing and Use) (Wales) Regulations 2016
387	The Animal Feed (Hygiene, Sampling etc. and Enforcement) (Wales) Regulations 2016
388	The Patents (European Patent with Unitary Effect and Unified Patent Court) Order 2016
389	The Criminal Justice Act 2003 (Surcharge) (Amendment) Order 2016
390	The Social Housing Rents (Exceptions and Miscellaneous Provisions) Regulations 2016
391	The Terrorism Act 2000 (Proscribed Organisations) (Amendment) Order 2016
392	The Financial Services and Markets Act 2000 (Regulated Activities) (Amendment) Order 2016
393	The Tax Credits (Income Thresholds and Determination of Rates) (Amendment) Regulations 2016
394	The Welfare Reform and Work Act 2016 (Commencement No. 1) Regulations 2016
395	The Education (Listed Bodies) (Wales) Order 2016
396	The Education (Recognised Bodies) (Wales) Order 2016
397	The Welsh Language (Wales) Measure 2011 (Amendment of Schedule 6) (No. 2) Order 2016
398	The Pollution Prevention and Control (Designation of Waste Directive) (England and Wales) Order 2016
399	UKSI number withdrawn
400	The Immigration (Health Charge) (Amendment) Order 2016

== 401–500 ==
Number	Title
401	The Annual Tax on Enveloped Dwellings (Indexation of Annual Chargeable Amounts) Order 2016
402	The Civil Proceedings, Family Proceedings and Upper Tribunal Fees (Amendment) Order 2016
403	The Insolvency Practitioners (Recognised Professional Bodies) (Revocation of Recognition) Order 2016
404	The Income Tax (Construction Industry Scheme) (Amendment of Schedule 11 to the Finance Act 2004) Order 2016
405	The Welsh Language Standards (No. 4) Regulations 2016
406	The Welsh Language Standards (No. 5) Regulations 2016
407	The Welfare Reform Act 2012 (Commencement No. 27 and Transitional and Transitory Provisions and Commencement No. 22, 23 and 24 and Transitional and Transitory Provisions (Modification)) Order 2016
408	The Pensions Act 2014 (Transitional and Transitory Provisions) Order 2016
409	The Welsh Language (Wales) Measure 2011 (Consequential Provisions) Order 2016
410	The Water Supply (Water Quality) (Amendment) Regulations 2016
411	The Private Water Supplies (Wales) (Amendment) Regulations 2016
412	The Social Services and Well-being (Wales) Act 2014 (Commencement No. 3, Savings and Transitional Provisions) Order 2016
413	The Social Services and Well-being (Wales) Act 2014 (Consequential Amendments) Regulations 2016
414	The Social Services Code (Role of the Director of Social Services) (Appointed Day) (Wales) Order 2016
415	The Hayle Harbour (Penpol Creek Footbridge) Order 2016
416	UKSI number withdrawn
417	The National Assembly for Wales (Returning Officers’ Charges) Order 2016
418	The Wireless Telegraphy (Licensing Procedures) (Amendment) Regulations 2016
419	The European Union Referendum (Counting Officers’ and Regional Counting Officers’ Charges) Regulations 2016
420	The Houses in Multiple Occupation (Specified Educational Establishments) (England) Regulations 2016
421	The A470 Trunk Road (Mallwyd to Dinas Mawddwy, Gwynedd) (Temporary Speed Restrictions & No Overtaking) Order 2016
422	The A55 Trunk Road (Junction 1, Kingsland Roundabout, Holyhead, Isle of Anglesey to east of Junction 11, Llys y Gwynt Interchange, Bangor, Gwynedd) (Temporary Prohibition of Vehicles & 40 MPH Speed Limit) Order 2016
423	The Companies (Address of Registered Office) Regulations 2016
424	The A55 Trunk Road (Junction 19, Llandudno Junction to Junction 22, Old Colwyn, Conwy) (Temporary Prohibition of Vehicles) Order 2016
425	The Firearms (Amendment) Rules 2016
426	The Wireless Telegraphy (Control of Interference from Apparatus) Regulations 2016
427	The Occupational Pension Schemes (Scheme Administration) (Amendment) Regulations 2016
428	The A55 Trunk Road (Junction 22, Old Colwyn to Junction 20, Brompton Avenue, Conwy) (Temporary Prohibition of Vehicles) Order 2016
429	The Food Hygiene Rating (Promotion of Food Hygiene Rating) (Wales) Regulations 2016
430	The Criminal Justice Act 2003 (New Method of Instituting Proceedings) (Specification of Relevant Prosecutors) Order 2016
431	The A494 Trunk Road (Clawdd Poncen to Llanbedr Dyffryn Clwyd, Denbighshire) (Temporary Prohibition of Vehicles & 30 mph Speed Limit) Order 2016
432	The Education (National Curriculum) (Science at Key Stage 4) (England) (Amendment) Order 2016
433	The Grants to the Churches Conservation Trust Order 2016
434	The Court of Appeal and Upper Tribunal (Lands Chamber) Fees (Amendment) Order 2016
435	The Automatic Enrolment (Earnings Trigger and Qualifying Earnings Band) Order 2016
436	The Disabled Persons’ Parking Badges (Scotland) Act 2014 (Consequential Provisions) Order 2016
437	The M1 Motorway (Junctions 16 to 19) (Variable Speed Limits) Regulations 2016
438	The Public Service Pensions Revaluation (Prices) Order 2016
439	The Child Support (Deduction Orders and Fees) (Amendment and Modification) Regulations 2016
440	The Air Navigation (Restriction of Flying) (Royal International Air Tattoo RAF Fairford) Regulations 2016
441	The Registrar of Companies and Applications for Striking Off (Amendment) Regulations 2016
442	The Education (Designated Institutions) (England) (No. 2) Order 2016
443	The Assured Tenancies and Agricultural Occupancies (Forms) (England) (Amendment) Regulations 2016
444	The A487 Trunk Road (Cardigan Bypass, Ceredigion) (40 mph Speed Limit) Order 2016
445	The A470 Trunk Road (Llangurig to Caersws, Powys) (Temporary Speed Restrictions & No Overtaking) Order 2016
446	The A40 Trunk Road (Scethrog, Powys) (Temporary Prohibition of Vehicles) Order 2016
447	The East Anglia ONE Offshore Wind Farm (Corrections and Amendments) Order 2016
448	The Greater Manchester Combined Authority (Election of Mayor with Police and Crime Commissioner Functions) Order 2016
449	The Tees Valley Combined Authority Order 2016
450	The Onshore Wind Generating Stations (Exemption) (England and Wales) (Amendment) Order 2016
451	The School Information (England) (Amendment) Regulations 2016
452	The Children and Young Persons Act 2008 (Commencement No. 8 and Saving Provision) (Wales) Order 2016
453	The Disabled Persons (Badges for Motor Vehicles) (Wales) (Amendment) Regulations 2016
454	The Vaccine Damage Payments (Specified Disease) Order 2016
455	The Infrastructure Act 2015 (Commencement No. 5) Regulations 2016
456	The Finance Act 2015, Schedule 20 (Appointed Days) Order 2016
457	The Renewables Obligation Closure Etc. (Amendment) Order 2016
458	The Apprenticeship Certificate (England) Regulations 2016
459	The A465 Trunk Road (Neath Interchange, Neath Port Talbot) (Temporary Traffic Prohibitions & Restrictions) Order 2016
460	The A11 Trunk Road (Fiveways to Thetford Improvement) (Detrunking) 2011 (Amendment) Order 2015 (Revocation) Order 2016
461	The A483 Trunk Road (Newbridge Bypass, Wrexham County Borough) (Temporary Prohibition of Vehicles) Order 2016
462	The A494 Trunk Road (Mold Bypass, Flintshire) (Temporary Prohibition of Vehicles & Cyclists) Order 2016
463	The A483 Trunk Road (Junction 1 (Ruabon Interchange) to the Wales/England Border, Wrexham County Borough) (Temporary Traffic Prohibitions and Restriction) Order 2016
464	The Care Act 2014 (Commencement No. 5) Order 2016
465	The Water Act 2014 (Commencement No. 6, Transitional Provisions and Savings) Order 2016
466	The Education and Adoption Act 2016 (Commencement, Transitional Provisions and Savings) Regulations 2016
467	The Regulation and Inspection of Social Care (Wales) Act 2016 (Commencement No. 1) Order 2016
468	The Air Navigation (Restriction of Flying) (State Opening of Parliament) Regulations 2016
469	The Air Navigation (Restriction of Flying) (The Patron's Lunch) Regulations 2016
470	The Air Navigation (Restriction of Flying) (Glastonbury Festival) Regulations 2016
471	The Hornsea One Offshore Wind Farm (Amendment) Order 2016
472	The A55 Trunk Road (Junction 11 (Llys y Gwynt Interchange), Bangor, Gwynedd to the Wales/England Border) and The A494/A550 Trunk Road (Ewloe Interchange, Flintshire) (Temporary Speed Limits & Prohibition of Vehicles) Order 2016
473	The Northern Ireland Assembly Elections (Returning Officer's Charges) Order 2016
474	The A5 Trunk Road (East of Chirk to Whitehurst Roundabout, North of Chirk, Wrexham County Borough) (Temporary Prohibition of Vehicles & Cyclists) Order 2016
475	The Environmental Permitting (England and Wales) (Amendment) (No. 2) Regulations 2016
476	The Education (National Curriculum) (Key Stage 4 Assessment Arrangements) (England) Order 2016
477	The Designation of Schools Having a Religious Character (Independent Schools) (England) Order 2016
478	The Education (National Curriculum) (Specified Purpose) (England) Order 2016
479	The A55 Trunk Road (Junction 27 (Talardy Interchange), Denbighshire to Junction 31 (Crossways Interchange), Flintshire) (Temporary Traffic Prohibitions & Restriction) Order 2016
480	The A55 Trunk Road (Junction 11 (Llys y Gwynt Interchange), Bangor, Gwynedd to Junction 36a (Broughton), Flintshire) and The A494 Trunk Road (Ewloe Interchange, Flintshire to the Wales/England Border) (Temporary Prohibition of Vehicles, Cyclists & Pedestrians) Order 2016
481	The Enterprise and Regulatory Reform Act 2013 (Consequential Amendments) (Bankruptcy) and the Small Business, Enterprise and Employment Act 2015 (Consequential Amendments) Regulations 2016
482	The March West and White Fen Internal Drainage Board Order 2016
483	The Welsh Ambulance Services National Health Service Trust (Establishment) (Amendment) Order 2016
484	The Consumer Rights Act 2015 (Commencement No. 3, Transitional Provisions, Savings and Consequential Amendments) (Amendment) Order 2016
485	The A483 Trunk Road (Cilyrychen Level Crossing, Llandybie, Carmarthenshire) (Temporary Prohibition of Vehicles, Cyclists & Pedestrians) Order 2016
486	The Wireless Telegraphy (Exemption) (Amendment) Regulations 2016
487	The A138 (Replacement Chelmer Viaduct) (Detrunking) Order 2016
488	The Police and Crime Commissioner Elections (Returning Officers’ Accounts) (Amendment) Regulations 2016
489	UKSI number withdrawn
490	The Building (Amendment) Regulations 2016
491	The M4 Motorway (Junction 22) (Temporary Prohibition of Traffic) Order 2016
492	The A40 Trunk Road (East of White Mill to Pensarn Roundabout, Carmarthen, Carmarthenshire) (Temporary Speed Restrictions & No Overtaking) Order 2016
493	The A470 Trunk Road (Maenan to Pentrefelin, Conwy County Borough) (Temporary Prohibition of Vehicles & 30 mph Speed Limit) Order 2016
494	The A40 Trunk Road (Llandovery Level Crossing, Llandovery, Carmarthenshire) (Temporary Prohibition of Vehicles, Cyclists & Pedestrians) Order 2016
495	The 1452–1492 MHz and 3400–3800 MHz Frequency Bands (Management) Regulations 2016
496	The General Dental Council (Fitness to Practise etc.) Order 2016
497	The Chief Regulator of Qualifications and Examinations Order 2016
498	The Proceeds of Crime Act 2002 (Investigations in different parts of the United Kingdom) (Amendment) (No. 2) Order 2016
499	The Air Navigation (Restriction of Flying) (Strathallan Castle) Regulations 2016
500	The Exempt Charities Order 2016

== 501 and above ==
Number	Title	Department responsible
501	The Air Navigation (Restriction of Flying) (Farnborough Air Show) Regulations 2016	Department for Transport
502	The Jobseeker's Allowance (Extended Period of Sickness) Amendment Regulations 2016	Department for Work and Pensions
503	The Export Control (Iran Sanctions) Order 2016	Department for Business, Energy and Industrial Strategy
504	The Belarus (Asset-Freezing) Amendment Regulations 2016	His Majesty's Treasury
505	The Approval of Code of Management Practice (Private Retirement Housing) (England) Order 2016	Department for Levelling Up, Housing and Communities
506	The M48 Motorway (Severn Bridge) (Temporary Prohibition and Restriction of Traffic) Order 2016	Department for Transport
507	The Tobacco and Related Products Regulations 2016	Department of Health
508	The Templeton Training Area Byelaws 2016	Ministry of Defence
509	The Imperial College Healthcare National Health Service Trust (Trust Funds: Appointment of Trustees) Revocation Order 2016	Department of Health
510	The Conduct of Employment Agencies and Employment Businesses (Amendment) Regulations 2016	Department for Business, Energy and Industrial Strategy
511	The Welfare Reform Act 2012 (Commencement No. 28) Order 2016	Department for Work and Pensions
512	The Financial Services (Banking Reform) Act 2013 (Commencement No. 10) Order 2016	His Majesty's Treasury
513	The A48 Trunk Road (Pont Abraham to Carmarthen, Carmarthenshire), the A40 Trunk Road (Carmarthen, Carmarthenshire to Fishguard, Pembrokeshire), the A477 Trunk Road (St Clears, Carmarthenshire to Pembroke Dock, Pembrokeshire) and the A4076 Trunk Road (Haverfordwest to Milford Haven, Pembrokeshire) (Temporary Prohibition of Vehicles) Order 2016	Welsh Minister for Economy, Science and Transport
514	The Police and Crime Commissioner Election (Local Returning Officers' and Police Area Returning Officers' Charges) Order 2016	Cabinet Office
515	The Homes and Communities Agency (Transfer of Property etc.) (No. 2) Regulations 2016	Department for Levelling Up, Housing and Communities
516	The Civil Legal Aid (Procedure) (Amendment) Regulations 2016	Ministry of Justice
517	The Patents (Amendment) Rules 2016	Department for Business, Energy and Industrial Strategy
518	The Approval of Code of Management Practice (Residential Management) (Service Charges) (England) Order 2016	Department for Levelling Up, Housing and Communities
519	The Social Security Administration Act 1992 (Local Authority Investigations) Regulations 2016	Department for Work and Pensions
520	The Air Navigation (Restriction of Flying) (Eastbourne) Regulations 2016	Department for Transport
521	The Electronic Cigarettes etc. (Fees) Regulations 2016	Department of Health
522	The Air Navigation (Restriction of Flying) (Leeds East Airport) Regulations 2016	Department for Transport
523	The Air Navigation (Restriction of Flying) (Bournemouth) Regulations 2016	Department for Transport
524	The Privacy and Electronic Communications (EC Directive) (Amendment) Regulations 2016	Department for Digital, Culture, Media and Sport
525	The Air Navigation (Restriction of Flying) (Wales National Airshow) Regulations 2016	Department for Transport
526	The Air Navigation (Restriction of Flying) (Her Majesty The Queen's Birthday Flypast) Regulations 2016	Department for Transport
527	The River Tyne (Tunnels) (Revision of Tolls) Order 2016	Department for Transport
528	The A55 Trunk Road (Junction 7 (Cefn Du), Isle of Anglesey to Junction 11 (Llys y Gwynt Interchange), Bangor, Gwynedd) (Temporary 30 mph & 50 mph Speed Limits) Order 2016	Welsh Minister for Economy, Science and Transport
529	The Pollution Prevention and Control (Fees) (Miscellaneous Amendments) Regulations 2016	Department for Business, Energy and Industrial Strategy
530	The Consumer Credit (Disclosure of Information) (Amendment) Regulations 2016	His Majesty's Treasury
531	The A465 Trunk Road (Dowlais Top Roundabout, Merthyr Tydfil to Aberdulais Interchange, Neath Port Talbot) (Temporary Prohibition of Vehicles, Cyclists & Pedestrians) Order 2016	Welsh Minister for Economy, Science and Transport
532	The Small Business, Enterprise and Employment Act 2015 (Commencement No. 5 and Saving Provision) Regulations 2016	Department for Business, Energy and Industrial Strategy
533	The Air Navigation (Restriction of Flying) (Weston Park) Regulations 2016	Department for Transport
534	The Air Navigation (Restriction of Flying) (Higham, Kent) (Emergency) Regulations 2016	Department for Transport
535	The Air Navigation (Restriction of Flying) (Silverstone and Turweston) Regulations 2016	Department for Transport
536	The Air Navigation (Restriction of Flying) (Portsmouth) Regulations 2016	Department for Transport
537	The A4060 Trunk Road (Abercanaid Roundabout to Dowlais Roundabout, Merthyr Tydfil) (Temporary Prohibition of Vehicles, Cyclists & Pedestrians) Order 2016	Welsh Minister for Economy, Science and Transport
538	The Electoral Administration Act 2006 (Commencement No. 9) Order 2016	Department for Levelling Up, Housing and Communities
539	The Posted Workers (Enforcement of Employment Rights) Regulations 2016	Department for Business, Energy and Industrial Strategy
540	The Air Navigation (Restriction of Flying) (Visit by the President of the United States of America) Regulations 2016	Department for Transport
541	The Air Navigation (Restriction of Flying) (Higham, Kent) (Emergency) (Revocation) Regulations 2016	Department for Transport
542	The Air Navigation (Restriction of Flying) (Clacton-on-Sea) Regulations 2016	Department for Transport
543	The Universal Credit (Care Leavers and Looked After Children) Amendment Regulations 2016	Department for Work and Pensions
544	The Social Security (Claims and Payments) Amendment Regulations 2016	Department for Work and Pensions
545	The Midland Metro (Birmingham City Centre Extension, etc.) (Land Acquisition and Variation) Order 2016	Department for Transport
546	The Magistrates’ Courts (Psychoactive Substances Act 2016) (Transfer of Proceedings) Rules 2016	Ministry of Justice
547	The A14 Cambridge to Huntingdon Improvement Scheme Development Consent Order 2016	Department for Transport
548	The Air Navigation (Restriction of Flying) (Dunsfold) Regulations 2016	Department for Transport
549	The Medicines and Healthcare Products Regulatory Agency Trading Fund (Amendment) Order 2016	Department of Health
550	The Third Parties (Rights against Insurers) Act 2010 (Commencement) Order 2016	Department for Business, Energy and Industrial Strategy
551	The Electoral Administration Act 2006 (Commencement No. 10 and Transitional Provision) Order 2016	Department for Levelling Up, Housing and Communities
552	The Safeguarding and Clergy Discipline Measure 2016 (Commencement No. 1) Order 2016	General Synod of the Church of England
553	The Psychoactive Substances Act 2016 (Commencement) Regulations 2016	Home Office
554	The Psychoactive Substances Act 2016 (Consequential Amendments) Regulations 2016	Home Office
555	The Information as to Provision of Education (England) Regulations 2016	Department for Education
556	The Social Security (Disability Living Allowance and Personal Independence Payment) (Amendment) Regulations 2016	Department for Work and Pensions
557	The Armed Forces and Reserve Forces (Compensation Scheme) (Amendment) Order 2016	Ministry of Defence
558	The Finance Act 2003, Section 66 (Prescribed Statutory Provisions) Order 2016	His Majesty's Treasury
559	The Patents (Isle of Man) (Amendment) Order 2016	Department for Business, Energy and Industrial Strategy
560	The Iran (Sanctions) (Overseas Territories) (Amendment) Order 2016	Foreign, Commonwealth and Development Office
561	The Civil Legal Aid (Procedure) (Amendment) (No. 2) Regulations 2016	Ministry of Justice
562	The Nuclear Installations (Liability for Damage) Order 2016	Department for Business, Energy and Industrial Strategy
563	The A465, A40, A449, A470 & A4060 Trunk Roads (Various Locations in South Wales) (Temporary Prohibition of Vehicles) Order 2016	Welsh Minister for Economy, Science and Transport
564	The Town and Country Planning (Operation Stack) Special Development (Amendment) Order 2016	Department for Transport
565	The Copyright (Free Public Showing or Playing) (Amendment) Regulations 2016	Department for Business, Energy and Industrial Strategy
566	The Banking Surcharge (Information) Regulations 2016	His Majesty's Treasury
567	The A5 Trunk Road (Llangollen, Denbighshire) (Temporary 40 mph Speed Limit) Order 2016	Welsh Minister for Economy, Science and Transport
568	The Financial Services (Banking Reform) Act 2013 (Commencement No. 11) Order 2016	His Majesty's Treasury
569	The Bank of England and Financial Services Act 2016 (Commencement No. 1) Regulations 2016	His Majesty's Treasury
570	The Third Parties (Rights against Insurers) Regulations 2016	Ministry of Justice
571	The Companies (Bodies Concerned with Auditing Standards etc.) (Exemption from Liability) Regulations 2016	Department for Business, Energy and Industrial Strategy
572	The A55 Trunk Road (Junction 14 (Madryn), Gwynedd to Junction 15 (Llanfairfechan), Conwy) (Temporary Prohibition of Vehicles, Cyclists & Pedestrians) Order 2016	Welsh Minister for Economy, Science and Transport
573	Not Allocated	
574	The Air Navigation (Restriction of Flying) (Northampton Sywell) (No. 2) (Amendment) Regulations 2016	Department for Transport
575	The Limited Liability Partnerships, Partnerships and Groups (Accounts and Audit) Regulations 2016	Department for Business, Energy and Industrial Strategy
576	The A487 Trunk Road (West Street, Newport, Pembrokeshire) (Temporary Prohibition of Vehicles) Order 2016	Welsh Minister for Economy, Science and Transport
577	The Fox Valley Way (formerly Steelworks East Access off the A616 Trunk Road, Stocksbridge Bypass) (Detrunking) Order 2016	Department for Transport
578	The Democratic People's Republic of Korea (European Union Financial Sanctions) (Amendment) Regulations 2016 (revoked)	Foreign, Commonwealth and Development Office
579	The Bank of England and Financial Services Act 2016 (Commencement No. 2) Regulations 2016	His Majesty's Treasury
580	The Air Navigation (Restriction of Flying) (Bath) (Emergency) Regulations 2016	Department for Transport
581	The Air Navigation (Restriction of Flying) (Leeds East Airport) (Amendment) Regulations 2016	Department for Transport
582	The Air Navigation (Restriction of Flying) (Jet Formation Display Teams) (No. 3) (Amendment) Regulations 2016	Department for Transport
583	The Prison and Young Offender Institution (Amendment) Rules 2016	Ministry of Justice
584	The Education (Student Fees, Awards and Support) (Amendment) Regulations 2016	Department for Business, Energy and Industrial Strategy
585	The Air Navigation (Restriction of Flying) (Bath) (Emergency) (Revocation) Regulations 2016	Department for Transport
586	The Civil Enforcement of Parking Contraventions Designation Order 2016	Department for Transport
587	The Housing (Right to Buy) (Designated Rural Areas and Designated Regions) (England) Order 2016	Department for Levelling Up, Housing and Communities
588	The Control of Electromagnetic Fields at Work Regulations 2016	Department for Work and Pensions
589	The A458, A483, A489, A470, A44 and A487 Trunk Roads (East of Middletown, Powys to Cardigan, Ceredigion) (Temporary Prohibition of Vehicles) Order 2016	Welsh Minister for Economy, Science and Transport
590	The Financial Services and Markets Act 2000 (Pensions Guidance) Regulations 2016	Department for Work and Pensions
591	The Licensing Act 2003 (His Majesty The Queen's Birthday Licensing Hours) Order 2016	Home Office
592	The Air Navigation (Restriction of Flying) (RNAS Culdrose) (Amendment) Regulations 2016	Department for Transport
593	The Enterprise and Regulatory Reform Act 2013 (Commencement No. 10 and Saving Provisions) Order 2016	Department for Business, Energy and Industrial Strategy
594	The Air Navigation (Restriction of Flying) (Leeds East Airport) (Revocation) Regulations 2016	Department for Transport
595	The Air Navigation (Restriction of Flying) (St Paul's Cathedral) Regulations 2016	Department for Transport
596	The Welfare Reform Act 2012 (Commencement No. 13, 14, 16, 19, 22, 23 and 24 and Transitional and Transitory Provisions (Modification)) Order 2016	Department for Work and Pensions
597	The Lloyd's Underwriters (Roll-over Relief on Disposal of Assets of Ancillary Trust Fund) (Tax) Regulations 2016	His Majesty's Treasury
598	The Banking Act 2009 (Commencement No. 5) Order 2016	His Majesty's Treasury
599	The Companies and Limited Liability Partnerships (Filing Requirements) Regulations 2016	Department for Business, Energy and Industrial Strategy
790	Pubs Code etc. Regulations 2016	Department for Business, Energy and Industrial Strategy
1052	Immigration (European Economic Area) Regulations 2016	
1245	The Companies, Partnerships and Groups (Accounts and Non-Financial Reporting) Regulations 2016	Department for Business, Energy and Industrial Strategy
