= List of acts of the Scottish Parliament from 2021 =

This is a list of acts of the Scottish Parliament passed in 2021. Acts of the Scottish Parliament are enacted by the Scottish Parliament, which has legislative authority over devolved matters in relation to Scotland under the authority of the Scotland Act 1998. Acts are cited by calendar year, in the same fashion as acts of Parliament of the United Kingdom. Each act passed in a respective year is numbered consecutively with Arabic numerals, following the prefix "asp".

20 acts of the Scottish Parliament were passed in 2021.

indicates that an act has been transcribed on Wikisource, indicates that an act is available to view at legislation.gov.uk, and indicates the location of the original act in the Parliamentary Archives.

== Acts of the Scottish Parliament ==
Short title	Citation	Royal assent
Long title
Period Products (Free Provision) (Scotland) Act 2021	2021 asp 1	12 January 2021
An Act of the Scottish Parliament to secure the provision throughout Scotland of free period products.
Solicitors in the Supreme Courts of Scotland (Amendment) Act 2021	2021 asp 2	20 January 2021
An Act of the Scottish Parliament to amend the Solicitors in the Supreme Courts of Scotland Act 1871 (Note: Solicitors in the Supreme Courts of Scotland Act 1871 (34 & 35 Vict. c. cvii)) in order to abolish the offices of librarian and fiscal; to rename the Widows' Fund as the Dependents' Fund and to make further provision as regards persons entitled to the benefit of that fund; to make new provision for members of the Society to resign; and to give the Society new powers including to close the Dependents' Fund completely or close it to new members, to create new categories of membership, or to wind up the Society; and for connected purposes.
Forensic Medical Services (Victims of Sexual Offences) (Scotland) Act 2021	2021 asp 3	20 January 2021
An Act of the Scottish Parliament to confer on health boards functions relating to the provision of forensic medical services to victims of sexual offences; and for connected purposes.
UK Withdrawal from the European Union (Continuity) (Scotland) Act 2021	2021 asp 4	29 January 2021
An Act of the Scottish Parliament to make provision for Scotland in connection with the withdrawal of the United Kingdom from the European Union, in particular to enable provision to be made that corresponds to provision in EU law after the United Kingdom's withdrawal; to establish guiding principles on the environment and to require public authorities to have due regard to those principles in making policies; to establish a body with the functions of ensuring compliance by public authorities with environmental law and monitoring the effectiveness of environmental law in protecting and improving the environment; to require the preparation and publication of an environmental policy strategy; and for connected purposes.
Scottish General Election (Coronavirus) Act 2021	2021 asp 5	29 January 2021
An Act of the Scottish Parliament to provide for measures relating to protection against coronavirus to apply to the ordinary general election for membership of the Scottish Parliament due to be held on 6 May 2021.
Protection of Workers (Retail and Age-restricted Goods and Services) (Scotland) Act 2021	2021 asp 6	24 February 2021
An Act of the Scottish Parliament to create an offence of assaulting, threatening or abusing retail workers; and to provide for a statutory aggravation of that offence where the retail worker is enforcing a statutory age restriction.
Scottish Parliament (Assistance for Political Parties) Act 2021	2021 asp 7	22 March 2021
An Act of the Scottish Parliament to enable the Parliament to make provision by resolution for payments to registered political parties for the purpose of assisting members of the Parliament who are connected with the parties to perform their Parliamentary duties.
Budget (Scotland) Act 2021	2021 asp 8	29 March 2021
An Act of the Scottish Parliament to make provision, for financial year 2021/22, for the use of resources by the Scottish Administration and certain bodies whose expenditure is payable out of the Scottish Consolidated Fund, for the maximum amounts of borrowing by certain statutory bodies and for authorising the payment of sums out of the Fund; to make provision, for financial year 2022/23, for authorising the payment of sums out of the Fund on a temporary basis; and for connected purposes.
Heat Networks (Scotland) Act 2021	2021 asp 9	30 March 2021
An Act of the Scottish Parliament to make provision for regulating the supply of thermal energy by a heat network, and for regulating the construction and operation of a heat network; to make provision about the powers of persons holding a heat networks licence; to make provision about conferring rights in heat network assets where a person ceases operating a heat network; to set targets relating to the supply of thermal energy by heat networks; to make provision about plans relating to increased use of heat networks; and for connected purposes.
Defamation and Malicious Publication (Scotland) Act 2021	2021 asp 10	21 April 2021
An Act of the Scottish Parliament to amend the law of defamation; replace the common law delicts of verbal injury with delicts of malicious publication; and for connected purposes.
Pre-release Access to Official Statistics (Scotland) Act 2021	2021 asp 11	21 April 2021
An Act of the Scottish Parliament to make provision about restricting pre-release access to certain official statistics; and for connected purposes.
Scottish Parliamentary Standards (Sexual Harassment and Complaints Process) Act 2021	2021 asp 12	21 April 2021
An Act of the Scottish Parliament to allow the Commissioner for Ethical Standards in Public Life in Scotland to investigate complaints of past sexual harassment made about members of the Parliament in respect of behaviour towards members of their own staff; to remove the default time limit for making complaints to the Commissioner; and to remove any requirement for the complainer's signature.
University of St. Andrews (Degrees in Medicine and Dentistry) Act 2021	2021 asp 13	23 April 2021
An Act of the Scottish Parliament to repeal paragraph 17 of schedule 6 of the Universities (Scotland) Act 1966. (Note: Universities (Scotland) Act 1966 (c. 13))
Hate Crime and Public Order (Scotland) Act 2021	2021 asp 14	23 April 2021
An Act of the Scottish Parliament to make provision about the aggravation of offences by prejudice; to make provision about an offence of racially aggravated harassment; to make provision about offences relating to stirring up hatred against a group of persons; to abolish the common law offence of blasphemy; and for connected purposes.
Redress for Survivors (Historical Child Abuse in Care) (Scotland) Act 2021	2021 asp 15	23 April 2021
An Act of the Scottish Parliament to establish a scheme of financial redress and related support for and in respect of survivors of historical child abuse in certain residential care settings in Scotland; to establish Redress Scotland and provide for its functions; to make provision for reporting by certain persons in relation to their redress activity; to make provision for the establishment of the Survivor Forum and the dissolution of the National Confidential Forum; and for connected purposes.
Domestic Abuse (Protection) (Scotland) Act 2021	2021 asp 16	5 May 2021
An Act of the Scottish Parliament to make provision for domestic abuse protection notices and orders for the purpose of protecting a person from abusive behaviour by the person's partner or ex-partner; and to make provision for the termination of Scottish secure tenancies in cases involving behaviour by a tenant which is abusive of the tenant's partner or ex-partner.
Tied Pubs (Scotland) Act 2021	2021 asp 17	5 May 2021
An Act of the Scottish Parliament to establish a Scottish Pubs Code to govern the relationship between tenants and owners of tied pubs; to establish the office of Scottish Pubs Code Adjudicator; and for connected purposes.
Dogs (Protection of Livestock) (Amendment) (Scotland) Act 2021	2021 asp 18	5 May 2021
An Act of the Scottish Parliament to increase penalties and provide additional powers to investigate and enforce the offence of livestock worrying, and for connected purposes.
Coronavirus (Extension and Expiry) (Scotland) Act 2021	2021 asp 19	4 August 2021
An Act of the Scottish Parliament to extend the period for which Part 1 of the Coronavirus (Scotland) Act 2020 (Note: Coronavirus (Scotland) Act 2020 (asp 7)) and Part 1 of the Coronavirus (Scotland) (No.2) Act 2020 (Note: Coronavirus (Scotland) (No. 2) Act 2020 (asp 10)) are in force; to provide for the expiry of certain provisions of those Parts; and for connected purposes.
Carer's Allowance Supplement (Scotland) Act 2021	2021 asp 20	15 November 2021
An Act of the Scottish Parliament to make provision about increasing the amount of the carer's allowance supplement.

== See also ==
- List of acts of the Scottish Parliament
