= UK Withdrawal from the European Union (Continuity) (Scotland) Act 2021 =

Act of the Scottish Parliament

- Act of the Scottish Parliament
- Scottish Parliament
- Long title: An Act of the Scottish Parliament to make provision for Scotland in connection with the withdrawal of the United Kingdom from the European Union, in particular to enable provision to be made that corresponds to provision in EU law after the United Kingdom’s withdrawal; to establish guiding principles on the environment and to require public authorities to have due regard to those principles in making policies; to establish a body with the functions of ensuring compliance by public authorities with environmental law and monitoring the effectiveness of environmental law in protecting and improving the environment; to require the preparation and publication of an environmental policy strategy; and for connected purposes.
- Citation: 2021 asp 4
- Introduced by: Michael Russell MSP
- Territorial extent: Scotland

Dates
- Royal assent: 29 January 2021
- Commencement: 29 January 2021

Status: Current legislation

Text of statute as originally enacted

Text of the UK Withdrawal from the European Union (Continuity) (Scotland) Act 2021 as in force today (including any amendments) within the United Kingdom, from legislation.gov.uk.

The UK Withdrawal from the European Union (Continuity) (Scotland) Act 2021 (asp 4) (known colloquially as the Continuity Act or the EU Continuity Act) is an Act passed by the Scottish Parliament on 22 December 2020 and receiving royal assent on 29 January 2021. It is a major Scottish constitutional statute, providing for devolved Scots law to stay aligned to future EU law despite the withdrawal of the United Kingdom from the European Union on 31 January 2020.

== See also ==
- European Union (Withdrawal) Act 2018
- Scottish devolution
