= 2013 United Kingdom budget =

Budget 2013
- Presented: Wednesday 20 March 2013
- Country: United Kingdom
- Parliament: 55th
- Party: Coalition government
- Chancellor: George Osborne
- Total revenue: £612 billion ($930 billion) (39% of 2012 GDP)
- Total expenditures: £720 billion ($1.1 trillion) (45% of 2012 GDP)
- Deficit: £108 billion (6% of 2012 GDP)
- Website: Budget 2013 documents

The 2013 United Kingdom budget was delivered by George Osborne, the Chancellor of the Exchequer, to the House of Commons on Wednesday 20 March 2013.

It was the fourth budget of the Conservative-Liberal Democrat coalition government that was formed following the 2010 general election, and also the fourth to be delivered by Osborne.

Its key points included an increase in the personal allowance, a reduction of the rate of corporation tax, a freeze of the rate of fuel duty, and the cancellation of the duty escalator on beer.

== Key measures ==
=== Taxes and revenue ===
The personal allowance each UK employee is entitled to earn before income tax is levied was increased for the third consecutive budget, to £10,000, from 2014. The increase had been planned to become effective in 2015 but was brought forward one year.

Before the 2012 budget, the rate of corporation tax in the UK was 26%. In his 2013 budget, Osborne announced another reduction in the rate in 2015 to 20%. The reductions would be offset by the bank levy.

New employment allowances will cut National Insurance bills for all UK firms, and 450,000 small businesses should pay no employer NI. Tax reliefs were also announced for investment in social enterprises, and Osborne axed a stamp duty on shares traded on growth markets such as the Alternative Investment Market.

Osborne cancelled an increase in fuel duty that had been planned for September 2013, and also cancelled a 3p increase in duty on beer planned for April 2013, instead cutting the beer duty by 1p from 24 March 2013. The duty escalator on beer was also cancelled, but remains in place for wine, spirits and cider. Duties on cigarettes were unchanged.

Tax incentives were announced for ultra low-emission vehicles and for investment in shale gas.

The Staffordshire Potteries industry will be exempt from the Climate Change Levy.

=== Taxes ===
| Receipts | 2013-14 Revenues (£bn) |
|---|---|
| Income Tax | 155 |
| National Insurance | 107 |
| Value Added Tax (VAT) | 103 |
| Corporate Tax | 39 |
| Excise duties | 47 |
| Council Tax | 27 |
| Business rates | 27 |
| Other | 107 |
| Total Government revenue | 612 |

=== Benefits and expenditure ===
An additional £15 billion of investment was announced for infrastructure such as roads, railways, power stations, and major construction projects by 2020.

Cuts of around 1% were announced to many government departments' budgets, except the Department for Health and Department for Education.

The income from fines arising out of the Libor scandal shall be given to soldiers' charities. Military wages would also be exempt from limits on progression pay rises imposed on the public sector.

=== Spending ===
| Department | 2013-14 Expenditure (£bn) |
|---|---|
| Social protection | 220 |
| Health | 137 |
| Education | 97 |
| Debt interest | 51 |
| Defence | 40 |
| Public order and safety | 31 |
| Personal social services | 31 |
| Housing and Environment | 23 |
| Transport | 21 |
| Industry, agriculture and employment | 16 |
| Other | 53 |
| Total Government spending | 720 |

== Economy ==
Osborne stated that the Office for Budget Responsibility (OBR) predicted that the UK would not enter recession again in 2013. The OBR cut its forecast for economic growth in 2013 to 0.6% from 1.2%. It forecast growth to be 1.8% in 2014, 2.3% in 2015, 2.7% in 2016, and 2.8% in 2017.

The OBR predicted government borrowing of £121 billion in 2013 and £120 billion for 2014. Government debt as a share of gross domestic product was forecast to increase from 75.9% in 2013 to 85.6% in 2016.

The majority of the other business tax changes announced impact small businesses, now receiving the benefits of the National Insurance Contribution. SMEs will also benefit from a certain number of reliefs such as capital gains relief on Seed Enterprise Investment Schemes and stamp duty relief from trading AIM-listed shares, which will help them raise capital. As for larger companies, the advantages of the new budget and incentives will be focused on Research and Development.

== Public procurement ==
The budget announced the government's intention to use the procurement process to promote suppliers' tax compliance.
