= Concession (contract) =

Grant of rights, land or property

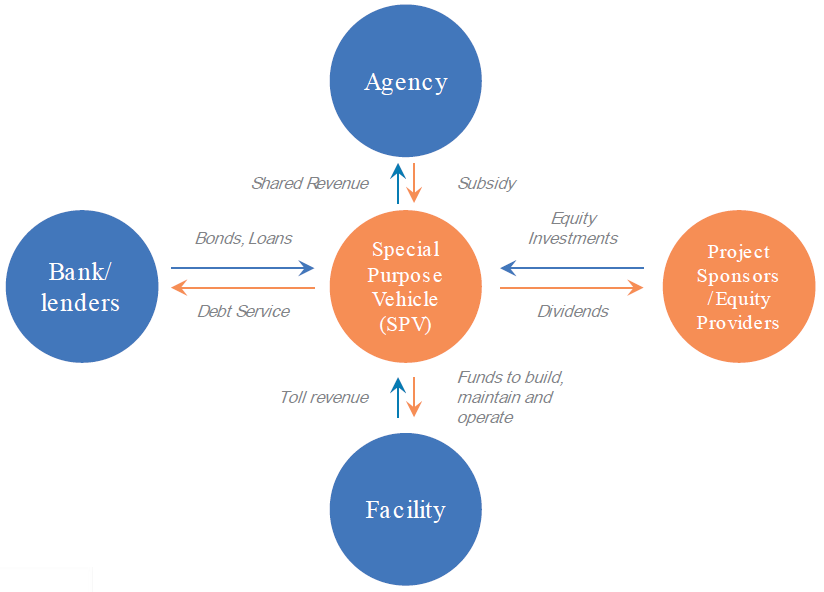
Typical Toll Concession P3 Structure

A concession or concession agreement is a grant of rights, land, property, or facility by a government, local authority, corporation, individual or other legal entity.

Public services such as water supply may be operated as a concession. In the case of a public service concession, a private company enters into an agreement with the government to have the exclusive right to operate, maintain and carry out investment in a public utility (such as a water privatisation) for a given number of years. Other forms of contracts between public and private entities, namely lease contract and management contract (in the water sector often called by the French term affermage), are closely related but differ from a concession in the rights of the operator and its remuneration. A lease gives a company the right to operate and maintain a public utility, but investment remains the responsibility of the public. Under a management contract the operator will collect the revenue only on behalf of the government and will in turn be paid an agreed fee.

A grant of land or a property by the government may be in return for services or for a particular use, a right to undertake and profit by a specified activity, a lease for a particular purpose. A concession may include the right to use some existing infrastructure required to carry out a business (such as a water supply system in a city); in some cases, such as mining, it may involve merely the transfer of exclusive or non-exclusive easements.

In the private sector, the owner of a concession — the concessionaire — typically pays either a fixed sum or a percentage of revenue to the owner of the entity from which it operates. Examples of concessions within another business are concession stands within sporting venues and movie theaters and concessions in department stores operated by other retailers. Short term concessions may be granted as promotional space for periods as short as one day.

Concession agreement may also state the role of an authority and concessionaire and conditions regarding control and ownership of the assets and facilities such as concession can either allow the authority to retain or keep actual ownership of the assets, turning over to the concessionaire and reverting the control and ownership back to an authority once the duration of their concession ended or both the authority and concessionaire control and own the facilities.

The assets and facilities that were built, designated, and acquired prior to the turnover of operations and maintenance from the authority to the concessionaire and are included on a plan of a project that was planned by an authority are predetermined as owned by the authority and to be operated and maintained by the concessionaire upon the turnover of operations and maintenance of the facilities and assets to the concessionaire. Those that were built, acquired and designated by the concessionaire may initially be owned and controlled by the concessionaire and these will be transferred to the authority once its concession duration is ended.

== Early history ==
=== Sultanate of Egypt ===
Muhammad Ali of Egypt used contracts called concessions to build cheap infrastructure - dams and railroads - whereby foreign European companies would raise capital, build projects, and collect most of the operating revenue but would provide Ali's government with a portion of that revenue.

== Regulation ==
=== European Union ===
Within the European Union, the granting of concessions by public bodies is subject to regulation. Works concessions have been subject to award rules for some time as Directive 2004/18/EC of the European Parliament and of the Council of the EU on public procurement applied to works concessions. The award of services concessions with a cross-border interest has been subject to the principles of the Treaty on the Functioning of the European Union. The European Commission had originally included public concession contracts in the Services Directive of 1992, but these were removed from its scope by the European Council. However, the European Parliament and the Council issued a further Directive 2014/23/EU on the award of concession contracts on 26 February 2014, which required EU member states to introduce national legislation covering the award of concession contracts in excess of EUR 5,186,000 awarded on or after 18 April 2016.

=== United Kingdom ===
In the UK, the equivalent threshold for concession contracts is £4,104,394. Concession contracts granted by public bodies fall within the term "covered procurement" in the Procurement Act 2023.

== See also ==
- Concessions and leases in international relations
- Public-private partnership
- Private finance initiative
- Production sharing agreement
