= Federation of Licensed Victuallers Associations =

- Abbreviation: FLVA
- Formation: 1992
- Legal status: Non-profit company
- Location: The Raylor Centre, James Street, York. YO10 3DW
- Region served: UK
- Members: Licensed victuallers in the UK
- Operations Director: Martin Caffrey
- Website: FLVA

The Federation of Licensed Victuallers Associations was the UK trade association for self-employed licensees in the pub trade industry. The derivation is from a victualler of goods.

== History ==
It was formed in 1992 when the National Licensed Victuallers Association was shut down, and the FLVA used the northern office of the NLVA. In December 2009, the Chief Executive, Tony Payne CBE, retired and day-to-day operational control passed to Martin Caffrey it moved its office location to York in 2013.. The FLVA ceased operations on the 31st March 2026.

== Structure ==
It was based in York in North Yorkshire. The management structure of the organisation consisted of a body of existing licensees headed by a President with a trustee overlay. Operational issues were handled through Operations Director. Membership was by annual subscription.

== Function ==
The organisation represented self-employed licensees of public houses (pubs) in the UK, and local Licensed Victuallers Associations. The landlord of a pub is known as a Licensed Victualler, the derivation is from a victualler of goods.

The Annual General Meeting was held each year no later than February last in Harrogate in North Yorkshire.

The organisation was also involved with the day-to-day issues of the licensed trade, offering practical assistance to its members, and saw its role as that of being the "publicans partner". It offered advice on becoming a self-employed licensee, providing assistance with staff employment, health and safety issues, disability audits, Landlord and Tenant Act legislation and rental and lease negotiations.

Through its Operations Director, the FLVA was represented on industry bodies such as the Pub Governing Body (PGB) which, as part of its duties, oversees dispute resolution services such as the Pubs Independent Conciliation and Arbitration Service (PICAS) and the Pubs Independent Rent Review Scheme (PIRRS). The Association was consulted by Government bodies, and had input in industry matters through the Department of Business Innovation and Skills, as well as the Valuation Office Agency in regards to the likes of Business Rates.

== See also ==
- British Institute of Innkeeping Awarding Body
- Licensing laws of the United Kingdom
- Licensing Act 2003
- Morning Advertiser
- The Publican
