= Government procurement in the United Kingdom =

Government procurement in the United Kingdom (Note: Also called "public procurement") is the purchase of goods, works (construction) or services by government agencies at the national and local levels. In 2023-24, £341 billion was spent on procurement from the private sector, 32% of public spending.

The Procurement Act 2023, which received royal assent on 26 October 2023, took effect from 24 February 2025 and governs the conduct of government procurement. Before the United Kingdom joined the European Communities in 1973 there was no significant legislation governing public procurement. In the intervening period, government procurement was subject to European Union procurement legislation.

== Value of public expenditure ==
In 2021, the government estimated the value of public sector expenditure on goods and services at around £290 billion per year, an increase of around £70 billion from a National Audit Office estimate for 2008–09. Both estimates suggest that one third of all public sector spending was devoted to the acquisition of goods and services. (Note: An alternative estimate included in Anne Glover's 2008 report, Accelerating the SME economic engine: through transparent, simple and strategic procurement, published in November 2008, valued public procurement at £175bn p.a. and 13% of the UK's GDP.)

Central government expenditure on third party goods and services was estimated at £54 billion in 2009-10 and £45 billion in 2011–12.

HM Treasury excludes public corporations from its estimates of the value of public procurement.

== Historical overview ==
The UK Government's first major statement on procurement strategy was published in 1984.

In local government, a policy of compulsory competitive tendering (CCT) was first applied to construction, maintenance and highways work under Part III of the Local Government, Planning and Land Act 1980. CCT was then extended to "blue-collar" services such as refuse collection by the Local Government Act 1988, sports and leisure management in 1989, and to "white-collar" services such as housing management in 1994/95.

Kenneth Clarke, then Chancellor of the Exchequer, published a Government procurement strategy White Paper in 1995 called Setting New Standards: A Strategy for Government Procurement (Cm 2840). In his statement to the House of Commons, Clarke observed that

With the development of the Government's policies for private finance, market testing, contracting out and internal markets, Departments are doing more of their business than ever before through procurement as against in-house provision. The annual spend is now about £40 billion a year and, in addition, purchasing authorities in the national health service internal market spend more than £20 billion. These policies have brought immense benefits to the country. Their full potential has still to be realised. The more procurement there is, the more important it becomes that Government Departments should make a first-class job of it.

Peter Gershon, in his 1999 Review of Civil Procurement in Central Government, referred to and followed the White Paper's definition of procurement as inclusive of "conventionally funded projects" and also those supported by "more innovative types" of funding such as PFI. Gershon noted in his findings that previous governments had decentralised procurement and delegated expenditure decisions to Departments without creating a framework for controlling how they spent public funds.

The Office of Government Commerce (OGC) set up a "Collaborative Procurement Programme" in 2007, managing over £18 billion of expenditure falling within eight categories of goods and services frequently purchased across the public sector, namely energy, vehicle fleet, travel, office solutions, information and communications technology, professional services, food and construction. A further category, facilities management, was added at a later date. The National Audit Office (NAO) argues that collaborative procurement begins with standardising specifications, which

allows public bodies to aggregate demand and compare unit costs. Lower prices should result either from economies of scale, or from using pricing information to challenge suppliers. Collaboration should result in fewer tendering exercises, leading to lower administrative costs, and allow public bodies to concentrate on more specialised purchases that are unique to them.

In the light of the economic downturn of 2008 onwards, sometimes referred to as the "Great Recession", the UK government adopted a series of ten "procurement for growth" principles, intended to ensure that UK government procurement would "take account of supply chain opportunities for UK companies in policy and delivery planning" and "analyse markets to assess where growth is achievable". In the March 2008 budget statement, the government announced that it wanted to see small and medium-sized enterprises (SMEs) "compete more effectively for public sector contracts". A review of progress with this initiative published in 2013 found that "against a backdrop of falling procurement spend", there had been a slight increase in direct expenditure with SMEs between 2011/12 (£4.4bn) and 2012/13 (£4.5bn). The 2008 budget statement also announced that businesses supplying services to Government would be able to sell their public sector invoices to debt specialists, a change which was expected to be "particularly advantageous to SMEs in managing their cash flow". This was a reversal of previous government contracting practice in model contract documents, where assignment of debts was allowed only with the prior consent of the relevant public body. Government suppliers who act as prime contractors for major contracts should also engage with SME's in their supply chains to ensure opportunities are available and fairly awarded. The government noted in 2013 that it did not yet have a full understanding of the role played by SMEs in the supply chains for their purchasing, especially their contribution to supplying the Ministry of Defence and the Department for Work and Pensions.

The UK public sector relies heavily on the use of framework agreements: the NAO found that 93% of the public bodies they surveyed had used a framework agreement during the financial year 2008–09. However, in a 2010 review of the use of framework agreements and other forms of collaboration, they noted that there was a "wide variation" among public bodies in the extent to which they were being used.

The Public Contracts (Amendment) Regulations 2009 came into effect on 20 December 2009, implementing the EU's Remedies Directive published on 20 December 2007. These regulations introduced the possibility of a contract being declared "ineffective" if it has been awarded by a contracting authority "in serious breach of the procurement rules", along with civil financial penalties and contract shortening, two alternative remedies available to the courts.

In August 2010, David Cameron, then recently elected as prime minister, invited businessman Sir Philip Green to carry out a review of UK government spending and procurement. Green's summary report, Efficiency Review by Sir Philip Green, published in October 2010, alleged significant failings in government procurement processes. The government published the review identifying its main finding as "the Government is failing to leverage both its credit rating and its scale". Green argued that the report gave "a fair reflection" of government waste and inefficiency in practice, for which "very poor data and process" were seen as the main causes. Cameron welcomed the report, saying "I think it's a good report, it will save a lot of money and it's important we do it."

Landline telephones offered the "best example" of where different government departments had separate contracts in place with different suppliers, so that overall government scale could not be levered effectively. Green suggested that an "urgent review" could lead to savings of 30-40% in this category of expenditure. "Poor negotiation" was further identified as a cause of inflexibility in contracts.

The coalition government of 2010 also made a "commitment to promote small business procurement", in particular by aiming to award 25% of government contracts (by value) to small and medium sized enterprises. At the same time a policy presumption was made that individual ICT contracts and projects "should be less than £100m lifetime costs". The government promoted and welcomed reform during the period from 2010 onwards, especially the development and implementation of European Commission's proposals to modernise procurement legislation published in 2011. A "strategic supplier summit" held in February 2011 promoted the government's intention to introduce more openness in relation to "the contracts it signs, the goods and services it purchases and the way it purchases them". The Cabinet Office was responsible for leading on UK engagement with the EU. In research undertaken by the Local Government Association (LGA) in 2010 to inform the LGA's views on the proposed modernisation legislation, 36% of local government officers responding to a survey stated that the 2006 directives had led to more efficient and effective procurement practice, but 54% felt that "the simplicity of the procurement process" had deteriorated. The 2006 directives had created greater legal uncertainty within the local government procurement community. Several responses highlighted the need for better guidance and support from the EU and from the Office of Government Commerce (OGC), which was then responsible for procurement policy. In February 2011 the UK Government stated its view that "the public procurement regime needs to be radically simplified to reduce red tape and improve value for money".

Part 3 of the Small Business, Enterprise and Employment Act 2015 allowed the Minister for the Cabinet Office or the relevant Secretary of State to impose further regulations on public bodies regarding how they undertake procurement, until this provision was replaced by the regulatory provisions in section 122 of the Procurement Act 2023. The Minister for the Cabinet Office is the minister with overall responsibility for procurement policy, which is delivered through the Government Commercial Agency, formerly the Crown Commercial Service, an executive agency sponsored by the Cabinet Office.

== Procurement policies ==
The Government Commercial Agency publishes Procurement Policy Notes from time to time, which advise procurement staff in the public sector of government policy developments and best practice in relation to procurement. Procurement Policy Notes on responding to the 2019-2020 coronavirus pandemic were published in March 2020 and remained in effect until 31 October 2020, allowing public bodies to make advance payments and retention payments for contracts which have been interrupted by the measures taken to reduce the spread of the coronavirus. Since 1 January 2021, the social value model in use among central government public bodies has included COVID-19 recovery, employment and social and community support as a key aspect of the economic, social and environmental well-being supported by public sector contracting.

CCS operated a Mystery Shopper scheme from February 2011 to November 2018, whose remit was to provide a route for suppliers to raise concerns about public procurement practice in England, The service was rebranded as the "Public Procurement Review Service" in November 2018, responding to feedback from suppliers and public bodies that the "mystery shopper" title did not properly reflect the role of the service.

The Public Contracts Regulations 2015 provide that public sector buyers must pay prime contractors within 30 days and must ensure that any subcontracts through the supply chain include a similar provision. In 2014–15 at least 33 NHS trusts paid fewer than half of their trade invoices on time, up from 23 in 2015–16 and 11 in 2014–15. Under the Better Payment Practice Code, they should pay at least 95% of non-NHS invoices within 30 days.

Within the context of local government, many local authorities have adopted the National Procurement Concordat for Small and Medium-Sized Enterprises to encourage SMEs to engage in procurement and supply for local public services. Examples include the City of Wakefield's Concordat agreed in 2005, and the Concordat agreed by East Suffolk Council in 2019.

The UK government requires all government departments and their related organisations to ensure that they meet the minimum mandatory Government Buying Standards (GBS) when buying goods and services. Organisations in the wider public sector are also encouraged to specify the minimum mandatory standards in their tenders, and the government also noted that "any organisation concerned about sustainable procurement [could] choose to follow them or to specify them in tenders".

As of 2023, many aspects of government policy pertaining to procurement have been brought together in The Sourcing Playbook.

=== Competitive dialogue ===
The competitive dialogue (CD) procedure was introduced into EU procurement law by the 2004 Directive "on the coordination of procedures for the award of public works contracts, public supply contracts and public service contracts" as a procedure available to Member States "in the case of particularly complex contracts". In 2011, Francis Maude, then Minister for the Cabinet Office, raised concerns that public procurers were using this procedure in cases which did not meet the "particularly complex" threshold, where pre-market engagement with suppliers would be more appropriate. The government therefore adopted a presumption against competitive dialogue, implemented from May 2012 through a requirement that within central government, departments wishing to use this procedure required approval from their Accounting Officer, or a Commercial Director in cases where the authority has been delegated. Guidance states that Accounting Officers should not sign off a competitive dialogue request if further pre-market engagement would better support the process of defining the nature or function of the goods or services required. The 2014 Directive and 2015 Regulations introduced some minor variations to the wording on how a CD must be conducted, for example provision for tenders to be "optimised" after they had been submitted was changed so that they could be "fine-tuned", while restriction on changes being made to the "basic features" of a tender was changed to a reference to its "essential features".

=== Food procurement ===
Noting that the public sector spent over £2 billion per year on the purchase of food and catering services (England and Wales) and that more than 30,000 public sector organisations were involved in food procurement, including schools and social services providers, the OGC and the Department for Children, Schools and Families launched a collaborative food group to review this area of procurement, leading to the launch of the Public Sector Food Procurement Initiative (PSFPI) in August 2003. The PSFPI set out to "encourage public bodies to procure food in a manner that considers the principles of sustainable development". Its initial aims were to:

- Promote food safety and increase the consumption of healthy and nutritious food;
- Mainstream good practice in food procurement and supply to improve efficiency and realise savings that can be ploughed back into improving public sector catering; and
- Improve sustainable performance at each stage of the food chain in support of the Government's Strategy for Sustainable Farming and Food.

A more extensive set of objectives was adopted in 2017 to reflect initial learning and revised government priorities. A Select Committee report published in 2021 noted that the government continued to expect that "food procurement should provide value for money while also ensuring 'high standards of production, animal welfare, traceability and sustainability to support our agricultural industry'.

=== Innovation ===
In 2008, the Department for Innovation, Universities and Skills' white paper, Innovation Nation required every government department to include an "Innovation Procurement Plan" within its commercial strategy, "setting out ... for the benefit of the various interested audiences ... how they will drive innovation through procurement and use innovative procurement practices".

The government's ambition to use procurement to secure more innovation can also be seen in guidance issued subsequent to the passage of the Procurement Act 2023.

=== International boycotts and sanctions ===
The government argues that

Public procurement should never be used as a tool to boycott tenders from suppliers based in other countries, except where formal legal sanctions, embargoes and restrictions have been put in place by the UK Government.

This policy is intended to prevent public sector organisations, including local councils, from adopting their own boycotts, including boycotting Israeli suppliers in particular. Then-Labour Party leader Jeremy Corbyn criticised the introduction of the policy as "an attack on local democracy".

=== Pre-market engagement ===
The government encourages departments to consult with potential suppliers before commencing formal procurement, noting in a 2012 Action Note that "it is not against EU procurement law to talk to potential suppliers before starting the formal procurement process", and confirming in 2016 that "pre-procurement engagement ... is now expressly permitted".

=== Procurement Route Decision Tree ===
Since 2011 the UK Government has operated a policy regarding the choice of procurement routes (for example, using the Open or Restricted procedures) and for recording the rationale supporting such choices. A "Procurement Route Decision Tree" was put in place to support this policy. The decision tree was updated on 30 July 2015 to accommodate the revision to procurement routes available under the Public Contracts Regulations 2015.

=== Procurement cards ===
Government departments use procurement cards to support prompt payment objectives; these can be used to pay for goods and services of any value. A dedicated form of payment card, the Government Procurement Card (GPC), was introduced in 1997 and can be used by central government departments, local government and other public bodies. Cards are issued by Barclays Bank, HSBC, Lloyds and National Westminster Bank.

The House of Commons Committee of Public Accounts noted in a report issued in 2012 that at that time, all seventeen central government departments were operating their own procurement card programmes. The Cabinet Office has established a central steering group charged with developing and sharing best practice, but the Public Accounts Committee recommended additional central controls, fearing that the controls then in place were not adequate "to prevent and deter inappropriate use". Of particular concern was the extensive use of cards by staff of the Ministry of Defence, who accounted for just under 75% of all card expenditure but where controls were felt to be weaker than those in place in other departments. The Committee also suggested that lodge cards offered a lower-risk alternative to the standard card. Lodge cards can be used for purchasing travel but not for other use, and allow for one centrally-held card to be used in conjunction with a centralised booking system.

In March 2025, the Cabinet Office ordered thousands of GPC card accounts to be suspended to support government plans to reduce public expenditure.

=== Procurement pipelines ===
Publication of a "procurement pipeline" provides notice of current and planned procurement activity to be undertaken by a purchasing organisation so that prospective suppliers can be made aware of business opportunities for which they may bid.

The 2011 Autumn Statement incorporated a series of supply-side measures which the government was undertaking "to rebalance and strengthen the economy in the medium term", which included extension of the existing pipelines in the construction and ICT fields to cover the publication of plans setting out the procurement needs for other categories by April 2012, "to give suppliers the confidence to invest for the future and compete on a level playing field".

Other more specialist procurement pipelines include:

- a new procurement pipeline for Building Digital UK (BDUK);
- publication of the government's steel procurement requirements over the 10 years from 2017 onwards;
- the Northern Ireland government's pipeline for Construction and Procurement Delivery;
- Homes England's commercial pipeline, first published 13 April 2022, updated periodically;
- the National Fire Chiefs Council's Fire Commercial Transformation Programme Pipeline.

Northern Ireland's procurement pipeline arrangements are supported by an industry liaison group, chaired by the Department of Finance and Personnel's Central Procurement Directorate (CPD).

=== Purchasing from small and medium-sized enterprises ===
Guidance issued in 2015 and 2016 confirmed that rules and good practice provisions intended to ensure that business opportunities were available for small and medium-sized enterprises were not intended to offer small businesses any preferential treatment. In November 2016 an advisory panel of 24 entrepreneurs and business figures was formed to advise the government on purchasing goods and services from SMEs, and a campaign was launched to demonstrate that "government is open for business", with a target of increasing government spending with SMEs to 33% of all third-party public expenditure by 2020. As of May 2023 the advisory panel includes 20 business leaders.

In 2024, Crown Commercial Services stated that 72% of the suppliers available to public sector purchasers via their commercial agreements were micro-, small and medium-sized enterprises.

=== Social and environmental considerations ===
UK procurement policy in line with its EU background allows for social and environmental considerations to be taken into account in procurement decision-making. Government guidance on this topic has noted that tenders which are "abnormally low" may hide practices of "social dumping" and must be rejected if it has been proved that low costs reflect non-compliance with environmental, social or labour laws. The government has also recommended that public bodies make provision in contracts for later termination if a contractor has failed to comply with such laws in its contract performance, confirming that a contract clause to this effect would be compliant with the requirement in law for "appropriate measures to ensure that in the performance of public contracts economic operators comply with applicable obligations in the fields of environmental, social and labour law" (Directive 2014/24/EU, Article 18(2).

=== Supplier management information ===
The OGC introduced a recommendation to central government departments and non-departmental public bodies in March 2010 suggesting inclusion within contracts of a clause under which the public body concerned could require the supplier to submit detailed management information.

=== Tax compliance ===
Government policy as announced in the March 2013 budget is to use the procurement process to promote tax compliance. Regulation 57 of the Public Contract Regulations provides for contracting authorities to exclude a supplier if they are aware that it is in breach of its obligations relating to the payment of taxes or social security contributions, and where the breach has been established by a judicial or administrative decision having final and binding effect. Suppliers bidding for contracts over £5,000,000 in expected value are required to self-certify their status regarding tax compliance. A revised policy statement was issued in February 2014 in order to clarify certain definitions.

=== Tendering requirements ===
A case raised by Turning Point Ltd. against Norfolk County Council in 2012 confirmed that it is legitimate and fair to include a requirement in a tender barring caveats and qualified bids.

=== Terms and conditions ===
A short form of terms and conditions for the acquisition of low value goods and services was published by the Cabinet Office in April 2014, allowing government departments to adopt consistent, appropriate and proportionate terms which did not over-burden suppliers.

=== Transparency ===
The Ministry of Defence made reference to making its acquisition decisions "more transparent and inclusive" in its 2002 Defence Industrial Policy statement. In this context, transparency was linked to the development of a competitive UK defence industry on which the armed forces could rely for more of its supply and equipment needs. Information about "the factors that affect acquisition decisions" was expected to help potential bidders form their business proposals in line with government needs.

General transparency principles applicable to government procurement were published in March 2015, and updated in February 2017, stating that there is a presumption in favour of contractual information being made publicly available (except in matters of commercial confidentiality such as pricing, intellectual property and business plans). The 2015 guidance made provision for a "safety valve" allowing suppliers to raise concerns if they felt that contractual information was being requested which did not add value, represented poor contract management practice or otherwise seemed unreasonable. The Scottish Government has also referred to a commitment to become "more transparent" about its procurement activity.

Tender opportunities advertised by public sector bodies in the UK are legally required to be published to the following sites:

- Contracts Finder for England for all tenders and contracts valued over £12,000 for central government and £30,000 for sub-central authorities and the NHS. These thresholds, formerly £10,000 and £25,000 respectively, were increased on 21 December 2022. According to OpenOpps, a tender publishing company, only 27% of all UK public sector tenders were published on Contracts Finder between 2015 and 2017. Updated information regarding the use of Contracts Finder was published by the Cabinet Office on 21 June 2021.
- Public Contracts Scotland for Scotland
- Sell2Wales for Wales
- eSourcing NI for Northern Ireland, in use since May 2008.

UK procurement law has inherited from EU procurement law the recognition that the principle of transparency "flows from" the principle of equal treatment, which had been stated in the EU procurement directives. Sir Robin Jacob noted in a 2014 appeal case that "transparency flows from equal treatment" and the two principles "necessarily overlap and are closely intertwined", with "no hard and fast distinction" between failures to apply either principle.

== Devolved administrations ==
=== Northern Ireland ===
The Public Contracts Regulations 2015 apply in Northern Ireland (NI) along with England and Wales.

The Central Procurement Directorate within the Department of Finance (formerly the Department of Finance and Personnel) is responsible for procurement policy. On approval by the Northern Ireland Executive, application of Northern Ireland Public Procurement Policy (NIPPP) is mandatory for central government departments, non-departmental public bodies and public corporations. A revised public procurement policy for Northern Ireland was adopted on 16 May 2002; the latest version (version 11) was issued in August 2014. A Concordat on Public Procurement was agreed on 1 June 2001 by the UK Government and the Northern Ireland Executive for the handling of EU, international and policy issues on public procurement.

Procurement Guidance Notes (PGNs) issued by the Department of Finance provide guidance to NI government departments, agencies, non-departmental public bodies and public corporations regarding procurement policy and best practice, for example on insurance cover. On 24 February 2017, a PGN was issued encouraging and promoting inclusion of art in the commissioning and delivery of publicly funded construction projects, including allocation of 1% of the net capital construction budget to fund art works.

In 2011 a construction framework agreement let by the Department of Education for Northern Ireland was set aside on the decision of the Northern Ireland Appeal Court. The contracting authority and the high court at first instance had assumed that quoted construction costs would be sufficiently comparable between bidding companies to allow their fee percentages to be used to identify which companies were the most cost-effective, and that a cost database would be capable of identifying the costs for each project called-off from the framework agreement. The Appeal Court found that the assumption being made was incorrect, and the conclusion of the framework agreement on that basis and various qualitative evaluation criteria had been a "manifest error".

In a separate framework agreement case also dealt with by the Court of Appeal in 2011, Morgan LCJ held that the Department of Finance and Personnel's sub-criteria associated with the quality element of their tender evaluation were largely predictable. However, because the Department had used weightings for the sub-criteria which had not been disclosed and could not easily have been predicted, there had been a breach of the transparency obligation.

=== Scotland ===
Procurement Reform (Scotland) Act 2014 (Note: Section 46.)
- Act of the Scottish Parliament
- Scottish Parliament
- Long title: An Act of the Scottish Parliament to make provision about the procedures relating to the award of certain public contracts; to require certain authorities to produce procurement strategies and annual reports; and for connected purposes.
- Citation: 2014 asp 12
- Territorial extent: Scotland

Dates
- Royal assent: 13 May 2014
- Commencement: various (Note: Section 45.)
Other legislation
Amended by	Scottish Elections (Reform) Act 2020

Status: Amended

Text of statute as originally enacted

Revised text of statute as amended

Text of the Procurement Reform (Scotland) Act 2014 as in force today (including any amendments) within the United Kingdom, from legislation.gov.uk.

Scottish public sector expenditure is estimated to be around £17.5 billion per year. The Public Contracts (Scotland) Regulations 2015 (SSI 2015/446) and the Public Contracts (Scotland) Regulations 2016 (SSI 2016/145) apply. The Procurement Reform (Scotland) Act 2014 (asp 12) requires contracting authorities to consider whether to impose community benefit requirements on contractors bidding for contracts in excess of £4,000,000 in value. The Procurement Act 2023 (see below) has only limited effect in Scotland: it applies to contracting authorities in Scotland which are either cross-border bodies or exercise "wholly reserved functions", and it ensures that devolved Scottish authorities cannot discriminate against suppliers covered by an international agreement relating to procurement to which the UK Government is a party.

In 2008, the Scottish government, Scottish local authorities and other public bodies established a "Supplier Development Programme" (SDP) intended to promote the tender-readiness and efficiency of small Scottish businesses wishing to tender for public sector contracts.

Scotland's statutory guidance on procurement, applicable from 1 November 2015, includes a requirement to address fair work practices, including paying a living wage (as calculated by the Living Wage Foundation) and from 1 April 2021 public bodies have been asked to promote the "Fair Work First" policy within procurement activity, which the government describes as its "flagship policy for driving high quality and fair work across the labour market in Scotland". The Scottish Government is a Living Wage Accredited Employer and encourages suppliers and other partners to adopt the Living Wage.

International labour standards, including those set by the ILO and by the European Union, should be respected by public sector contractors and sub-contractors.

Under the Public Contracts (Scotland) Regulations 2015, actions for alleged breach of a public authority's duty owed to an economic operator may be brought in the Sheriff Court or the Court of Session.

An independent review of Scottish public sector procurement in the construction field was published in 2013. The report noted the importance of public sector construction within Scotland but highlighted that procurement practices were often over-elaborate and documentation excessive in length. Guidance on the use of pain share/pain gain arrangements and target cost contracting, formulated as a result of the review, was issued to public sector procurers in 2017.

=== Wales ===
The Welsh public sector spends around £6bn. annually on procurement from third parties.

Two organisations – the National Procurement Service, established in 2013, and Value Wales – oversee Welsh public sector procurement. The role of Value Wales includes shaping procurement policy, monitoring procurement in practice, supporting, advising and developing procurement staff and ensuring compliance with procurement regulations. The Welsh government requires public sector bodies in Wales to include the delivery of social, economic and environmental benefits for the community as an integral consideration in procurement and for this purpose each public body in Wales must appoint a Community Benefits Champion.

The Welsh Government adopted a Code of Practice on Ethical Employment in Supply Chains in 2019, incorporating 12 commitments aiming to protect and promote good employment practices throughout the supply chain.

== Government Commercial Function and Government Commercial Organisation ==
The Government Commercial Function (GCF) is a cross-government network procuring or supporting the procurement of goods and services for the government. Sitting within the GCF, the Government Commercial Organisation (GCO) is the employer of senior commercial professionals (at Grade 7 and above) and consists of 250 senior commercial specialists. Around 4,000 civil servants who undertake or support the procurement of goods and services for government form the GCF alongside the more senior GCO professionals.

The GCF is responsible for the Government Commercial Operating Standards, whose purpose is "to set expectations and drive consistency in the planning, management and execution of commercial activities, ensuring contracts and relationships with suppliers realise value for money and result in delivery of high quality public services", and for optimising use of procurement information across UK government. The GCF's "Contracts and Spend Insight Engine" (CaSIE), first established in 2017, includes a "data lake" embracing current and future supplier and expenditure information used to enhance procurement decision-making and contract management.

== Post-Brexit government procurement ==
Under the agreement on the withdrawal of the United Kingdom from the EU, procurement procedures commenced under the relevant EU directives before the end of the transitional period continued to be governed by the relevant regulations up to the issue of a contract award notice. Similarly, framework agreemenrs let before the end of the transition period and contracts awarded through the use of such framework agreements, including those let after "exit day" (31 January 2020) remain subject to the EU directives. From 11 pm on 31 December 2020, "a UK-specific e-notification service" called the Find a Tender Service (FTS) replaced the use of OJEU. Contracting authorities and entities were expected to ensure that their contract notices are published on the new e-notification service as well as the relevant site listed above.

Since 31 December 2020, most UK e-senders (third parties who operate publication systems which submit notices to the EU Publications Office) have been able to post notices to the FTS, although the Cabinet Office has identified several e-senders who had not as of December 2020 successfully completed integration work to post notices.

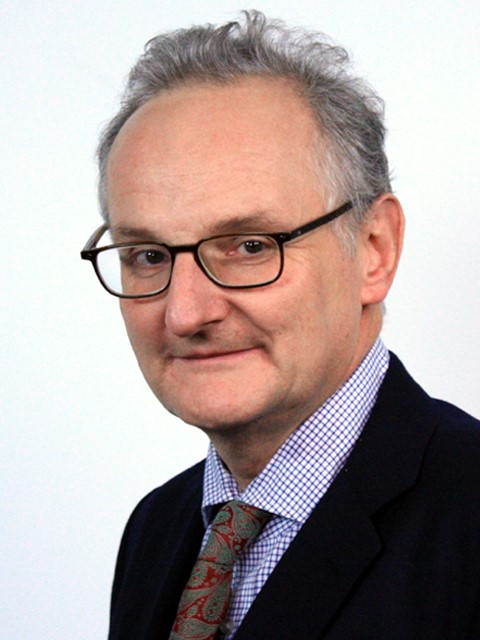
Lord Agnew

A green paper on reform of public procurement was published on 15 December 2020, taking advantage of "the end of the [Brexit] Transition Period", according to Lord Agnew, "to overhaul our outdated public procurement regime". Procurement Policy Note 11/20, also issued by the Cabinet Office on 15 December 2020, noted that following the end of the Transition Period, "below threshold procurement" could be reserved for suppliers based in certain geographical areas and/or reserved for small and medium-sized enterprises and voluntary, community and social enterprise organisations. An instruction to consider such reservations applies to central government departments, executive agencies and non-departmental public bodies while other contracting authorities are encouraged to apply the same principles in their own procurement.

The Competition and Markets Authority (CMA) issued a response to the green paper on 10 March 2021 detailing "ways in which reforms can harness the benefits of healthy, competitive markets". The CMA has proposed that "effective competition" should become a legal principle of public procurement, in order to secure better value for money and to reduce the possibility of illegal bid-rigging cartels influencing procurement decisions.

Subsequently, on 3 June 2021, a "National Procurement Policy Statement" was published, establishing that public procurement "should be leveraged to support priority national and local outcomes for the public benefit", in order to secure the creation of new businesses, jobs and skills, waste reduction, climate change mitigation, supplier diversity, resilience and innovation. National priorities were identified in this statement relating to social value, commercial and procurement delivery, and skills and capability for successful procurement, and the Government announced plans to introduce legislation to ensure that:

- all contracting authorities are required to have regard to the National Procurement Policy Statement when undertaking procurements;
- larger contracting authorities are required to publish procurement pipelines and to benchmark their procurement capability - those with an annual spend of £200m or more from April 2022, and others with an annual spend of £100m or more from April 2023.

== Procurement Act 2023 ==
The Procurement Act 2023 received royal assent on 26 October 2023. Subject to aspects of devolution, it affects public procurement and utilities' procurement in England and Wales, Scotland and Northern Ireland. It took effect on 24 February 2025.

In October 2023, the government also announced the establishment of a National Security Unit for Procurement (NSUP), based within the Cabinet Office, which

"will work across government, including with our national security community, to investigate suppliers who could pose a risk to national security. The Unit will create a new layer of protection, by assessing whether companies should be struck off from competing to supply goods and services to the public sector where they pose a threat."

A written answer given in the House of Lords in December 2023 confirmed that the unit was expected to become operational in the autumn of 2024 in conjunction with the implementation of the Procurement Act 2023. The role of the unit will include managing supplier debarment and exclusions relating to national security grounds.
