= Tied Pubs (Scotland) Act 2021 =

Act of the Scottish Parliament

- Act of the Scottish Parliament
- Scottish Parliament
- Long title: An Act of the Scottish Parliament to establish a Scottish Pubs Code to govern the relationship between tenants and owners of tied pubs; to establish the office of Scottish Pubs Code Adjudicator; and for connected purposes.
- Citation: 2021 asp 17
- Introduced by: Neil Bibby MSP
- Territorial extent: Scotland

Dates
- Royal assent: 5 May 2021

History of passage through the Parliament

Text of statute as originally enacted

Text of the Tied Pubs (Scotland) Act 2021 as in force today (including any amendments) within the United Kingdom, from legislation.gov.uk.

The Tied Pubs (Scotland) Act 2021 (asp 17) is an act of the Scottish Parliament which seeks to re-balance the relationship between the landlords of tied pubs and their tenants.

== History ==
At stage 1, the Economy and Fair Work Committee commended the intent behind the bill, but did not agree that legislation is required, and did not support the general principles of the bill. The report did describe that the establishment of a statutory code, an independent adjudicator and a market only rent option were welcome and overdue measures for a minority of committee members.

In 2023, Lord Harrower, a senior judge, passed an interim order preventing the Scottish Government from introducing regulations under the act. This order was overturned when the act was later ruled by the Inner House of the Court of Session to be within the legislative competence of the Scottish Parliament.

The first Scottish Pubs Code Adjudicator, Sarah Havlin was appointed in April 2024 for a period of three years.

== Provisions ==
The act requires the Scottish Government to publish a Scottish Pubs Code and to appoint a new Scottish Pubs Code Adjudicator. The act permits tenants to sell guest beers from smaller producers, or to move to a market rate lease that allows other suppliers.

== Reception ==
The president of the Scottish Beer and Pub Association, and chief operating officer of Hawthorn, The Community Pub Company wrote a column describing criticisms of the bill.

The Scottish Licensed Trade Association, which represents independent licensees, supported the bill on the basis that it would strengthen the ability of tenants to negotiate with pub landlords.

== See also ==
- Small Business, Enterprise and Employment Act 2015
- The Pubs Code Regulations 2016
