= European Economic Area Family Permit =

A European Economic Area Family Permit (short: EEA family permit) was an immigration document that assisted the holder to enter the United Kingdom as a family member of a citizen of a contracting state to the European Economic Area agreement or a Swiss citizen. They were issued by the UK immigration authorities under the Immigration (European Economic Area) Regulations 2006 (UK).

In theory, possession of a family permit was not mandatory and permission to enter the UK could still be sought at the frontier, but non-EEA nationals who neither possessed a visa nor a family permit would have found it difficult to arrive at the UK border as many carriers refused boarding to passengers who did not hold a family permit, as they may have been fined by the British authorities for carrying a visa-required national without a visa or family permit. In addition, family members were sometimes refused entry to the UK for failure to have a family permit. A family permit could be issued for a short visit or to enable the holder to take up residence in the UK. As the document was valid only for six months, a person seeking to enter the UK after that would need to have applied for a new one.

As a result of the UK leaving the European Union, applications for the European Economic Area Family Permit ended and existing permits ceased to be valid on 30 June 2021. A new "EU Settlement Scheme family permit" has been created as a replacement to the EEA permit.

== Legal framework ==
The Immigration (European Economic Area) Regulations 2006 extend visa free travel to third country nationals in possession of residence cards and permanent residence cards but this exception is limited to those cards issued by the UK government itself. Residence cards issued by other EEA states and Switzerland are not recognised under UK law and holders of same may apply for a family permit prior to leaving for the UK.

This was despite a provision of the EU's free movement directive which stated:

"Family members who are not nationals of a Member State shall only be required to have an entry visa in accordance with Regulation (EC) No 539/2001 or, where appropriate, with national law. For the purposes of this Directive, possession of the valid residence card referred to in Article 10 shall exempt such family members from the visa requirement."

While a member of the European Union, the legality of the requirement by the UK to require EEA family members a hold a family permit to enter the UK was long disputed by the European Commission. The UK defended the requirement on the basis of its opt-out from the Schengen Area which provided that:

"The United Kingdom shall be entitled, notwithstanding Articles 26 and 77 of the Treaty on the Functioning of the European Union, any other provision of that Treaty or of the Treaty on European Union, any measure adopted under those Treaties, or any international agreement concluded by the Union or by the Union and its Member States with one or more third States, to exercise at its frontiers with other Member States such controls on persons seeking to enter the United Kingdom as it may consider necessary for the purpose:

(a) of verifying the right to enter the United Kingdom of citizens of Member States and of their dependants exercising rights conferred by Union law, as well as citizens of other States on whom such rights have been conferred by an agreement by which the United Kingdom is bound; and

(b) of determining whether or not to grant other persons permission to enter the United Kingdom."

This act was repealed on 31 December 2020 along with the Immigration (European Economic Area) Regulations 2016 act which largely replaced the 2006 act.

== Application ==
EEA family permits were available from any entry clearance issuing post (most embassies and consulates) outside the UK, and were issued for six months at a time. A family member who wished to stay in the UK for more than six months could apply for a residence card to formalise their right of abode (or for a family member residence stamp in the first 12 months where the EEA national family member is a national of a newly joined member state for which transitional restrictions on the freedom of movement of persons still apply).

== Conditions of issue ==
A family permit would be issued if the applicant is the spouse, civil partner or dependent child of an EEA national and they were travelling to the UK with that person. There were also requirements connected to the need for the EEA person, if staying for more than three months, to be economically active or to be a self-sufficient person (called "exercising a treaty right") and for the family unit not to fall dependent upon public funds while in the United Kingdom.

If staying for less than three months, there was no need to exercise any treaty right.

== McCarthy case ==
The legality of the EEA family permit requirement was challenged before the European Court of Justice in R (McCarthy) v Home Secretary. Although an English High Court judge, Justice Haddon-Cave, had ruled against the McCarthys, he had decided to refer the matter to the European Court.

On 20 May 2014, Advocate General Maciej Szpunar issued an opinion in favour of the McCarthys, holding that the family permit requirement violated EU law. His opinion was advisory only, but the opinions of Advocates General are followed by the Court in most cases. On 18 December 2014, the Court of Justice ruled in favour of the McCarthys, reaffirming the Advocate General's opinion.

== See also ==
- European Union
- Modern immigration to the United Kingdom
- UKVisas
- UK Visas and Immigration
- Visa (document)
