= British Institute of Innkeeping =

British membership organization

- Abbreviation: BII
- Nickname: BII
- Formation: 1981
- Type: Membership organisation
- Legal status: Charitable
- Headquarters: Fleet, Hampshire
- Region served: United Kingdom
- Members: 13,500 (2026 estimate)
- Chief Executive Officer: Steven Alton
- Affiliations: British Institute of Innkeeping Awarding Body (BIIAB)
- Website: www.bii.org

The British Institute of Innkeeping (BII) is the professional body for individuals working in the licensed retail industry in the UK. This primarily includes pubs and bars.

== Background ==
The BII is a registered charity and membership organisation whose remit is to raise professional standards across the sector. BII is the trading name of the British Institute of Innkeeping a private company limited by guarantee and registered in England as a charity.

== Benefits ==
The British Institute of Innkeeping offers memberships to individuals working across the licensed hospitality sector, including pub tenants, lessees, free traders and managers. Membership provides access to a range of professional support services, resources, and industry information intended to assist members.

Member benefits include access to specialist helplines covering legal, licensing, employment, business rates, and health and safety. Members are also provided with business support resources, including staff contract templates, industry advice and networking opportunities. The organisation also publishes regular updates on regulatory developments and issues affecting the pub and licensed hospitality sector.

== Accredited Advisors ==
The BII developed a scheme, Accredited Advisors, to ensure that members are getting tailored pub-sector support across various areas of legal areas when it comes to running a pub. These, as of 2026, are Accountants, Building Surveyors, Chartered Surveyors, Fixture's and Fitting's Valuers, and Solicitors.

To be considered an Accredited Advisor, all advisors are interviewed to ensure they have a good understanding of the Pubs Code and Sub 500 Code (Codes of Practice), as well as being a part of the relevant professional body to the field, have indemnity insurance, and are currently active in the pub sector with appropriate experience.

== BII Training ==
In February 2023, the BII launched their Pre-Entry Awareness Course for prospective tenants/lessees who are considering signing a pub tenancy or lease agreement in England and Wales or Scotland. For pubs apart of the Pubs Code, the Pubs Code Adjudicator advises that all pub companies must "advise prospective tenants who do not have prior experience to complete pubs entry training, which raises awareness of the matters involved in operating a pub and entering into a tied agreement. Pub companies offer their own training, and the British Institute of Innkeeping (BII) offers a Pre-Entry Awareness Training (PEAT) course".

BII Training officially launched in 2024 with the release of their Level 2 Award for Personal Licence Holder (APLH) course.

== BII Events & Awards ==
=== Licensee of the Year (LOYA) ===
The Licensee of the Year (LOYA) award started in early 2000, recognising individuals and partnerships who demonstrate excellence in running successful, community-focused pub businesses.

According to BII, the competition assesses entrants across the areas of customer experience, business performance, leadership, marketing, sustainability, staff development and community engagement. The judging process involves mystery customer visits, business audits, and interviews.

The Licensee of the Year competition usually opens for entries in January each year. With the winner being crowned in June at the BII Summer Event.

Previous LOYA Winners
Year	Licensee	Pub	Postcode
2026	Eamonn England & Arina Piskunova	The Windsor Castle	N2 8DL
2025	Mike Dove & Tommy Higgs	Three Horseshoes	OX28 6NB
2024	Justine Lorriman	The Royal Dyche	BB11 3BW
2023	Joe Buckley & Flo Pearce	The Tollemache Arms	NN6 9NU
2022	Nick & Amanda Hemming	The Heron Inn	TR1 1SL
2021	Chris & Jason Black	The Pityme Inn	PL27 6PQ
2019	David Hage & Mark Osbourne	The Railway	NG14 7DU
2018	Alex & Tanya Williams	The Polgooth Inn	PL26 7DA
2017	Mark Higgs	The Castle	OX15 6DJ

=== BII Summer Event ===
The BII Summer Event is an annual networking and celebration at The HAC, London in June of each year.

=== National Innovation and Training Awards (NITAs) ===
The National Innovation in Training Awards (NITAs), taking place annually in November, showcases the individuals and businesses who put their people first, creating innovative training programmes and nurturing long-term careers in the licensed trade.

This award covers multiple categories related to training. These categories can include Professional Trainer of the Year, Hospitality Apprentice of the Year, Wellbeing, Best Training Programmes. These categories can change each year.

In addition to these categories, the NITAs also present the Franca Knowles: Live Your Life Award, a special memorial award founded by Keith Knowles OBE in memory of his late wife, Franca Knowles, whose passion for people and commitment to excellence left a lasting mark on the hospitality industry. The award recognises an individual who has gone above and beyond in their dedication to supporting, strengthening and championing the hospitality sector, often making a significant impact both behind the scenes and in the public eye.

=== People Conference ===
The BII People Conference takes place, annually, in November. Throughout the day, a variety of speakers and panels discuss a range of topics all relating to the pub industry.

== Publications ==
=== BII News ===
The BII publishes BII News, a quarterly magazine for its members covering industry news, operator interviews and best practices for licensees. It has been published since 1998 and is available in print and digital formats to members.

=== Industry Reports ===
The BII has published multiple industry reports, mostly in collaboration with KAM Insights, and member surveys on the UK pub sector, covering topics such as business conditions, workforce challenges, operating costs, and the impact of government policy.
