= Procurement Act 2023 =

Act of the Parliament of the United Kingdom

Procurement Act 2023 (Note: Section 128.)
- Act of Parliament
- Parliament of the United Kingdom
- Long title: An Act to make provision about procurement.
- Citation: 2023 c. 54
- Introduced by: Jeremy Quin, Minister for the Cabinet Office and Paymaster General (Commons); The Baroness Neville-Rolfe, Minister of State at the Cabinet Office (Lords)
- Territorial extent: England and Wales; Scotland; Northern Ireland; (Note: Section 126.)

Dates
- Royal assent: 26 October 2023
- Commencement: Various (Note: Section 127.)
Other legislation
Amends	Local Government Act 1988; Government of Wales Act 2006; Defence Reform Act 2014; Small Business, Enterprise and Employment Act 2015
Repeals/revokes	Defence and Security Public Contracts Regulations 2011; Public Contracts Regulations 2015; Concession Contracts Regulations 2016; Utilities Contracts Regulations 2016; Trade (Australia and New Zealand) Act 2023
Amended by	Levelling-up and Regeneration Act 2023; Trade (Comprehensive and Progressive Agreement for Trans-Pacific Partnership) Act 2024; Health Service Procurement (Wales) Act 2024; Procurement Regulations 2024; Procurement (Wales) Regulations 2024; Employment Rights Act 2025; Procurement Act 2023 (Threshold Amounts) (Amendment) Regulations 2025; Procurement Act 2023 (Threshold Amounts) (Amendment) (Wales) Regulations 2025; Procurement (Miscellaneous Amendments) (Wales) Regulations 2025; Procurement Act 2023 (Specified International Agreements and Saving Provision) (Amendment) Regulations 2025; Procurement Act 2023 (Specified International Agreements) (Amendment) (Wales) Regulations 2025; Procurement Act 2023 (Consequential and Other Amendments) Regulations 2025; Pension Schemes Act 2026

Status: Amended

History of passage through Parliament

Text of statute as originally enacted

Revised text of statute as amended

The Procurement Act 2023 (c. 54) is an act of the Parliament of the United Kingdom.

The act seeks to overhaul public procurement law in the United Kingdom by simplifying processes and giving a greater share of public sector supply opportunities to small businesses. It is one of the most radical reforms affecting businesses since Brexit: the UK Government sees it as "throwing complicated and bureaucratic EU rules into the bin [and] stripping back red tape". The government held a consultation in 2023 on how to implement the act's provisions including by supplementary provision by regulations.

== Parliamentary passage ==
The bill for the act was introduced to the House of Lords by Baroness Neville-Rolfe on 11 May 2022 and had its third reading in the House of Commons, after being introduced by Jeremy Quin, on 13 June 2023. The act was significantly amended when travelling through Parliament and there was a stand-off with both Houses during the wash-up period leading up to the 2023 prorogation of Parliament about the final form of the act and whether organ harvesting should be included in the act. The act was finally agreed to on 25 October 2023 and received royal assent on 26 October 2023.

A proposal allowing for companies who engage in forced organ harvesting to be excluded from public procurement opportunities was added during the bill's passage through the House of Lords, but later withdrawn because the broader provisions on professional misconduct would already cover this issue.

== Training ==
An "official learning and development offer for central government and the wider public sector" was launched in September 2023. The offer includes overview level training for suppliers as well as basic and advanced training for public sector procurement practitioners. The first tranche of overview training, referred to as "Knowledge Drops", was made available in December 2023. Other training on the act is available commercially.

== The Procurement Regulations 2024 ==
The Procurement Regulations 2024 (SI 2024/692) made provision about the public procurement regime under the act. It required transparency under the act, by requiring significant amounts of information for contractors and other applicants seeking a contract.

== Delay to entering into force ==
In April 2024, the Cabinet Office announced an intended "Go Live" date for the act of 28 October 2024. However, following the 2024 general election, the incoming Labour government announced a delay in implementation, until 24 February 2025.
