= Small Business, Enterprise and Employment Act 2015 =

Act of the Parliament of the United Kingdom

Small Business, Enterprise and Employment Act 2015 (Note: Section 165.)
- Act of Parliament
- Parliament of the United Kingdom
- Long title: An Act to make provision about improved access to finance for businesses and individuals; to make provision about regulatory provisions relating to business and certain voluntary and community bodies; to make provision about the exercise of procurement functions by certain public authorities; to make provision for the creation of a Pubs Code and Adjudicator for the regulation of dealings by pub-owning businesses with their tied pub tenants; to make provision about the regulation of the provision of childcare; to make provision about information relating to the evaluation of education; to make provision about the regulation of companies; to make provision about company filing requirements; to make provision about the disqualification from appointments relating to companies; to make provision about insolvency; to make provision about the law relating to employment; and for connected purposes.
- Citation: 2015 c. 26
- Territorial extent: United Kingdom (Note: Section 163.)

Dates
- Royal assent: 26 March 2015
- Commencement: Various (Note: Section 164.)
Other legislation
| Amends | House of Commons Disqualification Act 1975; Company Directors Disqualification Act 1986; Water Industry Act 1991; Further and Higher Education Act 1992; Employment Tribunals Act 1996 |
| Amended by | Wales Act 2017; Dissolution and Calling of Parliament Act 2022; Procurement Act 2023; Employment Rights Act 2025 |

Status: Amended

Text of statute as originally enacted

Revised text of statute as amended

The Small Business, Enterprise and Employment Act 2015 (c. 26), also referred to as SBEE, is an act of the Parliament of the United Kingdom that received royal assent in March 2015. Its contents include regulatory reform (part 2), public sector procurement (part 3) and company director disqualification issues (part 9). Its passage reflected a commitment in the Queen's Speech on 4 June 2014 to introduce legislation which would "help [to] make the United Kingdom the most attractive place to start, finance and grow a business".

== Provisions ==
=== Access to finance ===
The act aimed to support small businesses by cutting bureaucracy and enabling them to access finance. The provisions mentioned in the long title regarding "improved access to finance for businesses and individuals" are incorporated in Part 1 of the act. This part includes provision for regulatory control over contract clauses which "prohibit or impose a condition, or other restriction, on the assignment (or, in Scotland, assignation) by a party to the contract of the right to be paid any amount under the contract or any other contract between the parties". Provision for HMRC to disclose VAT non-financial registration information was included in Section 8.

=== Business impact target ===
Part 2 contained provision for the government to publish a "business impact target", which is

a target for the Government in respect of the economic impact on business activities of qualifying regulatory provisions.

Statutory guidance on this duty was published in January 2019.

The relevant legislative provisions, namely sections 21 to 27 of the 2015 Act, were repealed, and the business impact target itself was abolished by the Retained EU Law (Revocation and Reform) Act 2023.

=== Public sector procurement ===
Part 3 concerns powers to make further regulations regarding public sector procurement, including processes for entering into contracts and contract management (section 39) and investigations into procurement functions (section 40). One of the particular objectives underlying potential regulations would be to ensure that procurement functions are exercised in an efficient and timely manner. These sections were repealed by the Procurement Act 2023, although investigatory powers remain in place under Part 10 of the new procurement legislation.

Examples of public sector purchasing practices identified in a Cabinet Office consultation regarding the proposed legislation in 2014, before it was enacted, included over-complicating requirements and 'gold-plating' specifications, being over-prescriptive for lower value procurements, complex tender documentation, and making inappropriate use of framework agreements when they can be a barrier for small businesses, and internal decision making procedures.

=== Company directors ===
On 1 October 2015, Part 9 of the act came into force, which amended the Company Directors Disqualification Act 1986 to introduce:

- inclusion of relevant foreign offences as grounds for disqualification (s. 104)
- extension of the régime to persons instructing unfit directors of insolvent companies (s. 105)
- revision of the procedure for determining the unfitness of directors and shadow directors (s. 106)
- requirements for official receivers, liquidators, administrators and administrative receivers to report to the Secretary of State on the conduct of each person who was a director of a company on the insolvency date or within the three years before (s. 107)
- provision for compensation orders and undertakings on persons who are subject to disqualification orders or undertakings, where the person's conduct as a director caused loss to one or more creditors during the time he was a director of an insolvent company (s. 110)

=== Reporting on Payment Practices and Performance Regulations 2017 ===
The Reporting on Payment Practices and Performance Regulations 2017, issued under the act, came into force on 6 April 2017. Under these rules, all large UK companies are required to publish specific information regarding their payment policies, practices and performance, including the average time taken to pay supplier invoices, twice yearly. This information is made public in a report. The regulations lapsed on 6 April 2024, although the enabling power in section 3 of the act remains in force.

== See also ==
- Tied Pubs (Scotland) Act 2021
