= Metock v Minister for Justice, Equality and Law Reform =

Metock
- European Court of Justice

Submitted 25 March 2008 Decided 25 July 2008
- Full case name: Blaise Baheten Metock, Hanette Eugenie Ngo Ikeng, Christian Joel Baheten, Samuel Zion Ikeng Baheten, Hencheal Ikogho, Donna Ikogho, Roland Chinedu, Marlene Babucke Chinedu, Henry Igboanusi, Roksana Batkowska v Minister for Justice, Equality and Law Reform
- Case: C-127/08 ECR I-6241
- CelexID: 62008CA0127
- Nationality of parties: Family members who are nationals of non-member countries – Nationals of non-member countries who entered the host member state before becoming spouses of Union citizens

Legislation affecting
- Directive 2004/38

Keywords
- Right of Union citizens and their family members to move and reside freely in the territory of a member state

Metock v Minister for Justice, Equality and Law Reform (2008) C-127/08 is a European Union law case, significant in Ireland and Denmark, on the Citizens Rights Directive and family unification rules for migrant citizens. Citizenship of the European Union was established by Article 20 of the Treaty on the Functioning of the European Union (TFEU) and the Citizenship Directive 2004/38 elaborates the right of Union citizens and their family members to move and reside freely in the territory of a member state, consolidating previous Directives dealing with the right to move and reside within the European Community (EC). (Note: The Citizenship Directive 2004/38 indicates it has European Economic Area (EEA) relevance, meaning that its provisions also apply to Iceland, Norway, and Liechtenstein. Switzerland is not in the EEA, but has a similar agreement with the European Union (EU).)

It is a logical consequence of the right to free movement that migrant citizens can move their family from one member state to another. Not to allow this would deter them from moving and thus impede their right to free movement. But it is not immediately clear that migrant citizens should have the right to bring their family into a member state when the family members are entering the European Union (EU) for the first time. The Citizenship Directive 2004/38 imposes no condition that family members can only join on first entry if they are already resident within the European Union. Nevertheless, the Irish legislation implementing the directive required the family member to demonstrate lawful residence within the European Union prior to first entry. Metock clarified that it was not lawful to maintain such a requirement. A consequence was that in some member states, such as Denmark, migrant citizens possessed more rights to family reunification than their own nationals who had not exercised their right to free movement by taking up residence in another member state.

A non-EU national is a national of a country not in the European Union. In Metock the Court ruled definitively that national rules making the right of residence of non-EU national spouses of Union citizens resident in a member state but not possessing its nationality under the Citizenship Directive 2004/38 conditional on prior lawful residence in another member state were unlawful. It also ruled against national restrictions on when and where their marriage took place and how the non-EU national entered the host member state.

Blaise Baheten Metock, a national of Cameroon, arrived in Ireland on 23 June 2006 and applied for asylum. His application was definitively refused on 28 February 2007. Hanette Eugenie Ngo Ikeng, born a national of Cameroon, acquired United Kingdom nationality. She had resided and worked in Ireland since late 2006. Metock and Ngo Ikeng met in Cameroon in 1994 and had been in a relationship since then. They had two children together, one born in 1998 and the other in 2006. They were married in Ireland on 12 October 2006. On 6 November 2006, Metock applied in Ireland for a residence card as the spouse of a Union citizen working and residing in Ireland. The application was refused by decision of the Minister for Justice on 28 June 2007, on the grounds that Metock did not satisfy the condition of prior lawful residence in another member state.

Metock, Ngo Ikeng and their children brought proceedings against that decision. They were joined by three other non-EU national applicants. Ten member states expressed an interest in the case. The Court ruled in favour of the applicants on the grounds in the first place that no provision of the Citizenship Directive 2004/38 makes its application dependent upon previous lawful residence, and secondly that European Community (and not individual member states) legislature had the competence to regulate the first entry to the European Union of family members of a Union citizen who has exercised his right to free movement, and incidentally making a brief reference to Article 8 of the European Convention on Human Rights that enshrines the right to respect for private and family life.

The decision effectively overruled an earlier case Secretary of State for the Home Department v Hacene Akrich (2003) C-109/01 that the Irish government had relied on. The Akrich case involved an individual who had entered the UK without authorisation, and was twice deported from the United Kingdom. The individual came into the country a third time without authorisation and married a British citizen. He was soon thereafter deported to Dublin, where his wife was working, where he remained for six months. Following this, he attempted to return to the United Kingdom where his wife had secured employment. In Akrich, in direct contrast to the later Metock case, the ECJ held that the initial unauthorised entrance could be used by national authorities to prevent someone from claiming European rights of establishment.

== Facts ==
Metock was a Cameroonian national married to a British national working in Ireland. Metock had sought and been refused asylum in Ireland. He and his wife had formed a family in Cameroon prior to Metock's arrival in Ireland and they had two children, one born before Metock's arrival in Ireland and the other born the same year as his arrival. Ikogho, a non-EU national, arrived in Ireland in 2004, applied for and was refused asylum, and then married a British citizen working in Ireland since 1996. Chinedu, a Nigerian national, arrived in Ireland in 2005, applied for and was refused asylum, but before the refusal married a German national working in Ireland. Igboanusi, a Nigerian national, applied for asylum in Ireland, which was refused in 2005. He married a Polish national working in Ireland in 2006, and was deported to Nigeria in December 2007.

All four men had their applications for residence cards refused on the grounds that either they did not satisfy a condition of prior lawful residence or in the case of Ikogho that they were staying illegally in Ireland at the time of their marriage. All but Metock had met their spouse after arriving in Ireland and all four were married in Ireland. Together with their spouses (and in the case of Metock their children) they brought proceedings against the decision.

The High Court of Ireland made a request for a preliminary ruling to the European Court of Justice (ECJ). The High Court affirmed that none of the marriages were marriages of convenience. In essence the High Court asked:

1. Does Directive 2004/38 ("the Citizenship Directive") permit a member state to maintain a prior lawful residence requirement, as did Irish legislation?
2. Does Article 3(1) of the Citizenship Directive 2004/38 include within its scope of application a non-EU national who is a spouse of a Union citizen who resides in the host member state, and then resides in the host member state with the Union citizen as his/her spouse irrespective of when or where their marriage took place or how the non-EU national entered the host member state?
3. If the answer to 2 was negative, whether Article 3(1) includes non-EU nationals who entered the host member state independently of their spouse and subsequently married them there. (Note: For example, the Citizenship Directive 2004/38 might apply to spouses who were married before entering the member state but not to those who married after entering the member state, granting the same right of family reunification enjoyed by long-term residents but not extending it.)

The case was granted a rare accelerated hearing given the exceptional urgency of the circumstances with regard to both the pressure on the Irish Minister of Justice and the human rights of the applicants in regard to the right to respect for private and family life as enshrined in Article 8 of the European Convention on Human Rights. The case was thus determined after hearing the Advocate General M. Poiares Maduro but without an Opinion being submitted.

Ten member states besides Ireland were heard. These were Czech Republic, Denmark, Germany, Greece, Cyprus, Malta, the Netherlands, Austria, Finland and the United Kingdom. In addition the Commission of the European Communities was heard.

== Judgment ==
The judgment established several important points:

- The right of family members to join European Union citizens is regulated only by the Citizenship Directive 2004/38. A member state may not impose any additional regulations such as previous lawful residence in a member state.
- It does not matter that the family member met and married their partner after entering the European Union.
- It does not matter if the family member had entered the European Union illegally or was living there illegally at the time of their marriage.
- Breaches of immigration policy not involving the fundamental interests of society or abuse of rights and fraud, such as marriages of convenience, may be penalised only proportionally, such as by imposing a fine, and not in a way that interferes with the family member's right to freedom of movement and residence, and this applies from the moment the family member derives his rights.

The judgment settled that the European Community (EC), and not individual member states, was competent to regulate the right of entry into the European Union of non-EU family members of Union citizens who have exercised their right of free movement. Previously, case law had been unclear.

Regarding the issue of reverse discrimination arising from migrant citizens receiving more rights to family reunification than host member state nationals who have not exercised their right to free movement by taking up residence in another member state, the Court reiterated that settled case-law had established the so-called "wholly internal rule" and that the alleged discrimination thus fell outside the scope of European Community law.

The first question

On the first question regarding the condition of prior lawful residence in another member state, the Court noted in the first place that no provision of the Citizenship Directive 2004/38 makes its application conditional on prior residence in a member state. Indeed, some of its provisions suggest that it is applicable to family members not already lawfully resident in another member state. Thus Article 5(2) allows entry without a residence card while Article 10(2) is an exhaustive list of documents that may need presenting, which nevertheless does not include any documents demonstrating prior lawful residence in another member state.

Accordingly, the Citizenship Directive 2004/38 must be interpreted as granting rights of entry and residence to non-EU national family members of EU citizens not possessing the nationality of their host member state without distinguishing whether there had been prior lawful residence in another member state.

This interpretation was supported by the Court's earlier case-law adopted before the Citizenship Directive 2004/38. It was true that the Court had held in Akrich [50–51] that prior lawful residence in another member state was a requirement but that conclusion must be reconsidered as it was incompatible with MRAX [59] and Commission v Spain 2005 [28]. (Note: For example, Commission v Spain 2005 [28] affirms ".. the right of entry into the territory of a Member State granted to a third‑country national who is the spouse of a national of a Member State derives from the family relationship alone." In this case the Court ruled that Spain had failed to implement a number of directives predating the Citizenship Directive 2004/38 correctly.)

In the second place this interpretation was consistent with the division of competences between member states and the European Community. Community legislature was competent to enact the necessary measures to bring about freedom of movement for Union citizens. Union citizens would be discouraged from exercising their right of free movement if they could not be accompanied or joined by their family, and consequently the Community was competent to rule on the issue.

The Court rejected the argument put forward by the Irish government and several member states that member states retained exclusive competence to regulate first entry. This would lead to variation of treatment across the Community incompatible with the objective of an internal market set out in Article 3(1)(c) of the Treaty on the Functioning of the European Union. (Note: Article 3(1)(c) of the Treaty on the functioning of the European Union provides for an internal market characterised by the abolition of obstacles to the free movement of goods, persons, services and capital.) Moreover, it would lead to the paradoxical outcome that non-EU nationals who are long-term residents (Note: A long term resident is a non-EU national who has resided lawfully in a member state for at least five years. They enjoy favourable rights under the Long-term Residents Directive 2003/109. These include the right to family reunification, which they may apply for before they have qualified for long-term residence once they have reasonable prospects of attaining it.) would be able to bring in their family members not lawfully resident in a member state under the Family Reunification Directive 2003/86 whereas a Union citizen in a member state whose nationality he does not possess might not.

Consequently, the Citizenship Directive 2004/38 confers rights of entry and residence to non-EU national family members of EU citizens not possessing the nationality of their host member state regardless of whether there had been prior lawful residence in another member state.

Regarding the submission by the Irish government and several member states that this interpretation of the Citizenship Directive 2004/38 would undermine the ability of member states to control immigration and lead to a great increase in the number of persons able to benefit from rights of residence, the Court replied that it only applied to non-EU national family members of Union citizens who had exercised their right of free movement. Moreover, member states may still refuse entry and residence in accord with Articles 27 and 35 of the Citizenship Directive 2004/38, dealing respectively with personal breaches of public policy, public health or public security and abuse of rights or fraud, such as marriages of convenience.

The same governments had also submitted that this interpretation of the Citizenship Directive 2004/38 would lead to unjustified reverse discrimination, in so far as nationals of the host member states who had never exercised their right of freedom of movement would not derive the same rights. The Court replied that it was already established case-law that the alleged discrimination fell outside the scope of European Community law, citing Flemish Insurance [33]. (Note: Flemish Insurance [33] affirms " ...Treaty rules governing freedom of movement for persons and the measures adopted to implement them cannot be applied to activities which have no factor linking them with any of the situations governed by Community law and which are confined in all relevant respects within a single member state". In this case, however, the Court found the situation not to be wholly internal. See also the Opinion of Advocate General Sharpston [112–157] in the case.) Moreover, member states are parties to Article 8 of the European Convention on Human Rights enshrining the right to respect for private and family life.

Finally regarding the first question, the Court ruled that it was not lawful to maintain a condition of prior lawful residence in another member state.

The second question

On the second question regarding the scope of the Citizenship Directive 2004/38, the Court noted in the first place that the Citizenship Directive 2004/38 aims to facilitate the exercise of the right of Union citizens to move and reside freely within the territory of member states and in particular recital 5 of its preamble provides that right, if it is to be exercised under objective conditions of dignity, should also be extended to family members irrespective of their nationality. The provisions of the directive must not be interpreted restrictively, as affirmed in Eind [43]. (Note: Eind [43] affirms ".. According to settled case-law of the Court of Justice, secondary Community legislation on movement and residence cannot be interpreted restrictively." Eind clarified that returning migrants could continue to rely on their European Union rights.)

The directive provides family members of Union citizens the right of entry and residence without any provision requiring the Union citizen already to have founded the family when he moved to his host member state. Not to allow this right would discourage him from continuing to reside there and encourage him to leave to be able to lead a family life in another member state or in a non-member country. The Court ruled therefore that the right applied regardless of whether the Union citizen had founded his family before or after establishing himself in the host member state.

On the issue of whether a family member who has entered the host member state before becoming a family member of a Union citizen can be said to accompany or join him, the Court noted that refusing the right of entry or residence in that circumstance would be equally likely to discourage the Union citizen from remaining. To insist on a literal interpretation of 'join' or 'accompany' would be restrictive and equivalent to limiting the rights of entry and residence of the family member.

On the issue of the circumstances of the family member's entry, the Court observed that from the moment the family member derives their right of residence, a member state may only restrict that right in compliance with Articles 27 and 35 of the Citizenship Directive 2004/38, dealing respectively with personal breaches of public policy, public health or public security and abuse of rights or fraud, such as marriages of convenience. Member states are entitled to impose penalties, such as a fine, for other breaches so long as they are proportionate and do not interfere with freedom of movement and residence, as affirmed in MRAX [77]. (Note: MRAX [77] affirms "Community law does not prevent the member states from prescribing, for breaches of national provisions concerning the control of aliens, any appropriate sanctions necessary ... provided that those sanctions are proportionate." In this case the Court ruled that the right of entry and residence stem directly from Treaty law and a failure to comply with its formalities does not remove it.)

On the question of where the marriage took place, the Court observed that the directive contains no requirement.

Finally regarding the second question, the Court ruled that all the circumstances fell within the scope of the Citizenship Directive 2004/38.

The third question

There was no need to answer the third question as the second question had been answered in the affirmative.

== Significance ==
The effect of Metock is much enhanced by Eind and Singh, which confirmed that returning migrants continue to enjoy the family reunification rights they enjoyed while residing in another member state. This has led to the so-called Europe route whereby a national of a member state circumvents national restrictions on family reunification by taking up residence in another member state, thus exercising his right of free movement and subsequently relying on his right to family reunification under the Citizenship Directive 2004/38 on his return. A number of member states have claimed this amounts to an abuse of free movement, but in Akrich the Court ruled that taking up residence in another member state expressly to gain community rights is not an abuse.

The case has unintentionally created a vastly foreseeable and predicted consequences in member states' ability to control their borders. The case has undeniably aided the efforts of non-EU nationals seeking to circumvent ordinary immigration procedures by marrying EU nationals, with the Irish authorities stating that around half of the marriages in Ireland in a 2 1/2 years, 2015 to 2017, were bogus, motivated not by love, but by immigration status. The Irish Police cited that 400 sham marriages had been found to have occurred since 2015.

All member states have implemented Metock. Ireland reacted swiftly, implementing the judgment just four working days after receiving it and undertaking to apply it retrospectively. Austria, Cyprus, Czech republic and Slovakia, Denmark, Germany, Finland, France, Italy, Lithuania and the United Kingdom are amongst other member states that amended their legislation or policy as a result of Metock. Regarding the issue of reverse discrimination, Austria has explicitly legislated that their nationals must have exercised their right of free movement to gain European Union family reunification rights. Italy, however, decided to avoid reverse discrimination by granting their nationals the same rights of family reunification as their non-national Union citizens. Attention has switched in a number of member states to preventing abuse of European Union rules on residence rights. These include Denmark, France, Hungary, Ireland, Lithuania, the Netherlands and Sweden. Denmark, Ireland and the Netherlands have called for amendments to be made to the Citizenship Directive 2004/38. The Netherlands has announced its intention to open negotiations at the European level to put an end to abuses of the so-called "Europe route" where a national migrates to another member state for a period of time so as to exercise his right of free movement and thus gain European Union rights of family reunification on his return, circumventing national restrictions. A small but growing number of member state nationals, especially from Denmark and the Netherlands, indulge in such migration to the concern of their national authorities. On 5 October 2012, the Council of State of the Netherlands requested a preliminary ruling from the Court on four questions relating to the "Europe route".

=== Denmark ===
Denmark's Justice and Home Affairs (JHA) opt-out provided Denmark with the freedom to pursue its own relatively strict policies regarding asylum and family reunification, in particular its implementation of the controversial 24-year rule designed to discourage forced marriages that has nevertheless attracted criticism on human rights grounds. However Metock depends on the Citizenship Directive 2004/38, which is not part of EU co-operation on Justice and Home Affairs, and Denmark is thus obliged to implement Metock.

=== Netherlands ===
On 5 October 2012, the Council of State of the Netherlands referred four questions for a preliminary ruling from the Court related to the so-called "Europe route". In essence these were:

1. Should the Citizenship Directive 2004/38 apply analogously as in Eind and Singh when a national of a member state returns after receiving services in another member state in the sense of Article 56 of the Treaty on the Functioning of the European Union? (Note: Article 56 of the Treaty on the Functioning of the European Union provides for the free movement of services.)
2. If so, is a minimum period of residence required in the other member state?
3. If so, does this still apply when the residence was intermittent, for example at weekends?
4. In these circumstances, does a delay between the national's return to his member state and the entry of a non-EU national who is a family member into the member state potentially mean that the family member's rights have expired?

== See also ==
- Directive 2004/38/EC on the right to move and reside freely
- Residence card of a family member of a Union citizen
