= Harmonisation of law =

Process of creating common standards between members of an economic market

In the European Union, harmonisation of law (or simply harmonisation) is the process of creating common standards across the internal market. Though each EU member state has primary responsibility for the regulation of most matters within their jurisdiction, and consequently each has its own laws, harmonisation aims to:

- create consistency of laws, regulations, standards and practices, so that the same rules will apply to businesses that operate in more than one member state, and so that the businesses of one state do not obtain an economic advantage over those in another as a result of different rules.
- reduced compliance and regulatory burdens for businesses operating nationally or trans-nationally.

An objective of the European Union to achieve uniformity in laws of member states is to facilitate free trade and protect citizens.

Harmonisation is a process of ascertaining the admitted limits of international unification but does not necessarily amount to a vision of total uniformity.

== Characteristics of harmonisation ==
Harmonisation is usually not comprehensive but partial, in that it does not seek to create a sole authority of law on a particular subject. This is because measures to harmonise law cannot go further than that which is necessary.

Harmonisation is unsystematic. The directives of the European Union do not focus on or contain comprehensive regulation of the entire law. The directives regulate some very specific issues and they regulate them only for particular situations or circumstances and only for particular types of parties. This is most prevalent in European Union contract law.

Harmonisation generally takes place on two levels of governance, the overarching body and each of the members individually. Taking the European Union, the two levels are the European level and national level. Although both European and national legislators share the legislative responsibilities, neither of these bodies has final responsibility for the whole. Also, there is no superior political authority which has the final say on who is responsible for what, i.e. no overarching authority over the European and national legislators. The European Court of Justice may however determine the extent of harmonisation when determining cases.

Harmonisation is dynamic, in that the instruments of harmonisation aim at change, in particular improving and establishing consistent conditions for the operation of legal principles.

== Harmonisation versus unification ==
The unification and harmonisation of laws are similar in the sense that both involve approximating several legal systems and both are also oriented towards establishing some level of integration from a previous situation characterized by diversity. On the other hand, unification and harmonisation have different fundamental aims. The former works towards complete unity in substance and detail whereas the latter avoids complete uniformity, and is primarily concerned with approximating the fundamental principles of national laws. In unification, for example, a new law completely replaces the national laws that have existed before. A harmonisation law on the European level does not exceed mere approximation and leaves the national differences in place as long as they are not expressly regulated by the harmonising law. Here, national laws merely become closer but not identical.

Unification also focuses on substituting or combining two or more legal systems and replacing them with a single system. Harmonisation on the other hand seeks to co-ordinate different legal systems by “eliminating major differences and creating minimum requirements or standards”

“Unlike unification which contemplates the substitution of two or more legal systems with one single system, harmonisation of law arises exclusively in comparative law literature, and especially in conjunction with interjurisdictional, private transactions. Harmonisation seeks to ‘effect an approximation or coordination of different legal provision or systems by eliminating major differences and creating minimum requirements or standards’”.

Harmonisation can be seen as a step towards unification and, in a way, harmonisation aims or strives towards unification.

== Efforts to achieve harmonisation ==
Harmonisation is not a new concept. However, the problem is that no harmonisation project has ever reached completion. That is due to the nature of harmonisation, it is designed to incorporate different legal systems under a basic framework.

This is the appeal of harmonisation, it takes into account the local factors yet applies general principles to make a consistent framework of law. It generally incorporates local factors under a relatively unified framework. An example of harmonisation can be drawn from the European Union and the use of Directives.

Directives require transposition into the domestic legal system of the Member State in order to become effective. If a Member State fails to transpose the Directive in a timely manner or fails to do it at all, the Directive will take 'direct effect', that is, individuals are able to derive rights from that Directive directly despite not being transposed into domestic law. A Directive could be transposed through enactment under legislation from the national parliament or through agreement by reference. The Directives are flexible to the extent that the national authorities of the Member States have the choice of the form and method of the implementation of the Directive. This takes into account the fact that Member States have differing legal systems. Hence this allows the establishment of a harmonised framework of laws whilst preserving the established national laws of each member. This is the major appeal of harmonisation over unification.

Harmonisation can be achieved in two ways, actively or passively. The most common is the active pursuit of harmonisation usually through the enactment of legislation which incorporates the harmonised principles into the local law. Passive harmonisation may occur through non-legislative agreements or a convergence of case law. So far, passive harmonisation is the least successful since the non-legislative agreements tend to be voluntary. The convergence of case law is more promising since:

"All that matters is that the courts of different European States achieve similar results in the same cases, regardless of which norms, doctrines or procedures they apply in order to reach this end."

== Harmonisation and convergence of law ==
Harmonisation is synonymous with convergence of the law however harmonisation is usually associated via active pursuit through enacting legislation whereas convergence is generally associated with a passive approach such as a natural convergence of law through custom and frequent use of harmonised principles.

The most prominent example of harmonisation in international law is UNCITRAL (United Nations Commission on International Trade Law).

== Criminal law ==
=== Substantive criminal law ===
Article 83 of the Treaty on the Functioning of the European Union (TFEU) defines the scope of the European Union’s competence to harmonise substantive criminal law.

Under Article 83(1) TFEU, the EU may adopt minimum rules on the definition of criminal offences and sanctions in relation to a closed list of particularly serious crimes with a cross-border dimension. These offences, commonly referred to as “Eurocrimes”, are considered to require a common EU-wide approach due to their nature or impact. The list currently includes terrorism, trafficking in human beings, sexual exploitation of women and children, illicit drug trafficking, illicit arms trafficking, money laundering, corruption, counterfeiting of means of payment, computer crime, and organised crime. The list is exhaustive but may be expanded by a unanimous decision of the Council. For the offences listed in Article 83(1), harmonisation measures are adopted through the ordinary legislative procedure.

In recent years, the scope of Article 83(1) has been the subject of debate. In particular, the European Commission has proposed extending the list of Eurocrimes to include all forms of hate crime and hate speech, prompting renewed discussion on the limits and justification of criminalisation in the context of EU harmonisation of substantive criminal law.

Article 83(2) TFEU establishes a separate, functional basis for harmonisation. It allows the EU to introduce minimum rules on criminal offences and sanctions where such measures are essential to ensure the effective implementation of EU policies that have already been harmonised in other fields. This provision applies where criminal law is regarded as a necessary enforcement tool, for example in areas such as environmental protection or market abuse.

The rationale of harmonization of substantive criminal law is thus visible through its focus on the Eurocrimes, as the harmonization is not only aimed at the objective pursuit of security promotion for better protection against these crimes, but also as a means to achieve broader policy goals as such. The securement of a high level of security goes directly to the functioning of the EU as a whole, with the shared values of today's supranational area of freedom, security, and justice, coming from the past's economic community, being expressed in today's harmonized substantive criminal law.

=== Criminal procedural law ===
Harmonisation of criminal procedural law is increasing, but it is limited by Article 82(2) of the Treaty on the Functioning of the European Union (TFEU), which grants the European Parliament and the Council the competence to establish minimum standards and not fully uniform rules. Accordingly, harmonisation of criminal procedural law only entails the adaptation of national laws to European requirements, rather than the complete replacement of national laws with European standards. Adopting appropriate measures regarding the fight against crime should be undertaken to achieve the objective of the EU to provide an area of freedom, security and justice, on which the EU has a shared competence with Member States. The EU has the power to act only as far as the Member States cannot sufficiently do so themselves and must not go beyond what is necessary to achieve the objectives of the Treaties.

According to Article 82(2) TFEU, minimum rules may be prescribed by a Directive in the areas of mutual admissibility of evidence between Member States, rights of individuals in criminal procedure, rights of victims of crime, and any other specific aspects of criminal procedure that Council and Parliament agreed on.

Several Directives were established under this legal basis, including Directive 2010/64/EU on the right to interpretation and translation, Directive 2012/13/EU on the right to information, Directive 2013/48/EU on the right of access to a lawyer, to have a third party informed upon detention, and to communicate with third persons and consular authorities, Directive 2016/1919/EU on the right to legal aid, and Directive 2016/343/EU on the strengthening of certain aspects of the presumption of innocence.

Directive 2016/343/EU on the presumption of innocence shields and reinforces the procedural right that is recognised in case law all throughout the Union, and represents one of the most pertinent aspects of the general right to a fair trial. Specifically, the Directive ensures that all Member States grant suspects on trial in their national legal system the presumption of innocence, reiterates that the burden of proof is on the prosecution, prohibits public statements by authorities that would refer to the suspects as being guilty, reinforces the right to remain silent and not to incriminate oneself, and ensures the existence of sufficient safeguards surrounding these standards.

In other aspects of criminal procedure, legislation to harmonise must be unanimously decided by the Council and approved by the European Parliament. Despite the fact that the Member States are party to the ECHR and the ICCPR, this alone does not provide a sufficient degree of trust in the criminal justice system of other Member States and mutual trust is essential for mutual recognition, which forms the basis of judicial cooperation within the European Union and represents the ultimate objective pursued by the EU through its Directives. Harmonisation rights through EU secondary law, many of which may also be enshrined in broader human rights instruments such as the ECHR or the Charter, gain particular significance from the enforcement mechanisms that secondary legislation introduces under EU law; mainly decentralised enforcement by national courts. This is possible through the principle of direct effect, which allows individuals to invoke and enforce rights directly before national courts when defence-rights Directives have not been implemented, or have been implemented inadequately, in domestic legal systems. The fact that each Member State can be held accountable by its citizens for violating such rights is a cornerstone of mutual trust and effective judicial cooperation.

== Limits and Safeguards ==
Although Article 83 TFEU significantly expands the EU’s competence in the field of criminal law, this competence is subject to important limits and safeguards. Case law such as Taricco illustrates the tension between the effectiveness of EU law and fundamental principles of national criminal law, in particular the principle of legality. While EU obligations may require effective enforcement of Union interests, national courts are not required to disapply domestic criminal law where this would breach fundamental rights or core constitutional principles. In addition, the Treaties provide institutional safeguards, notably the “emergency brake” mechanism in Articles 82(3) and 83(3) TFEU, allowing Member States to halt legislation that would affect fundamental aspects of their criminal justice systems, as well as opt-out arrangements for certain Member States. Finally, EU criminal law measures remain subject to the general principles of subsidiarity and proportionality as enshrined by Art 5 TEU and are limited to the establishment of minimum rules, thereby preserving national discretion and legal traditions.

== See also ==
- 28th regime
- Criticisms of globalization
- European Union law
- Federal preemption (United States)
- Home state regulation
- Intergovernmental immunity (United States)
- Interposition (United States)
- Lesser magistrate
- Mutual recognition agreement
- Paramountcy (Canada)
- Parliamentary sovereignty
- Primacy of European Union law
- Reverse discrimination (EU law)
- Rule according to higher law
- Supremacy Clause
- Uniform Act
