= Reverse discrimination (EU law) =

Discrimination against EU citizens by their own country

In EU law, reverse discrimination occurs when the national law of a member state of the European Union provides for less favourable treatment of its citizens or domestic products than other EU citizens/goods under EU law. Since the creation of the Single Market, the right of EU citizens to move freely within the EU with their families. The right to free movement was codified in EU Directive 2004/38/EC which applies across the whole EEA. However, reverse discrimination is permitted in EU law because of the legal principle of subsidiarity, i.e. EU law is not applicable in situations purely internal to one member state. This rule of purely internal situation does not apply if the EU citizens can provide a cross-border link, e.g. by travel or by holding dual EU citizenship. EU citizens and their families have an automatic right of entry and residence in all EU countries except their own, with exceptions created by a cross-EU state border link. For example, an Irish citizen living in Germany with his family before returning to Ireland can apply for EU family rights. This is referred to as the Surinder Singh route. The cross-border dimension has been the focus of many court cases in recent years, from McCarthy to Zambrano.

There are different treatments across national laws in the EU, with some EU states such as Italy making equality a legal requirement, while other EU states such as Ireland and Germany allow such reverse discrimination.

== Case law ==
=== ECJ Case C‑34/09 Zambrano ===
Article 20 TFEU precludes national measures which have the effect of depriving Union citizens of the genuine enjoyment of the substance of the rights conferred on them by that status: Case C-34/09 Ruiz Zambrano.

I therefore suggest to the Court that Article 18 TFEU should be interpreted as prohibiting reverse discrimination caused by the interaction between Article 21 TFEU and national law that entails a violation of a fundamental right protected under EU law, where at least equivalent protection is not available under national law.

— Opinion of Advocate General Sharpston

Advocates General's opinion play an important role and are referred to in later cases.

Distinguish this from Case C-434/09 McCarthy: A Union citizen who is a national of more than one Member State does not mean that she has made use of her right of freedom of movement; a risk of deprivation or of any impediment to exercising her rights must be shown.

=== Naasan Saiedi Cyprus Supreme Court [2006] 3 ΑΑ ===
Judgment

Of course it is not expected that the Directive would provide for a right to Cypriots to reside in their own country and surely we would come down to absurd results if we would accept that the applicant could reside lawfully in any other country of the EU except for Cyprus.

Clearly for reasons of equal treatment of Cypriot citizens with other EU citizens, we cannot but accept that the rights conferred to relatives of nationals of other member states are granted to the relatives of Cypriots, too.

=== TM & Ors v Minister for Justice, Equality and Law Reform Ireland High Court [2009] IEHC 500 ===
Judgment

The High Court found that there was no reverse discrimination against the family because as Irish citizens they were not in the same position as Union citizens exercising EU Treaty rights. In any event, the EU has always recognised the principle of reverse discrimination. Ireland is entitled to treat its own citizens less favourably than other Union citizens who are in a position to rely on specific EU Treaty rights which Irish citizens are not in a position to avail of.

== Treatment in member states’ domestic law ==
=== Austria ===
Austria current status is confusing,

The Austrian Constitutional Court ruled in 1997 against reverse discrimination. But the Austrian legislator reintroduced reverse discrimination in 2005.

Ruling from the Austrian Constitutional Court has said that if the rules governing family reunification of EU citizens in a cross-border situation, are not applied to Austrian nationals because of the purely internal situation, this is a breach of Art 8 & 14 of ECHR without objective and reasonable justification.

The authority concerned measures with reference to the case law of the Administrative Court (see VwGH April 14, 1994, 94/18/0127-0132, September 5, 1996, 94/18/0465-0472, 95/18/0128, February 21, 1996, 95 /21/1248) assigns the same content to the term "EEA citizen" in §28 Aliens Act on the one hand and that in §29 Aliens Act on the other. This obviously means that Austrian citizens are placed at a disadvantage compared to nationals of EEA member states (as defined in Section 28 Para. 1 of the Aliens Act) with the exception of Austria. In the specific context, however, no objective justification can be found for Austrian citizens being placed in such a worse position than foreign nationals. See also the examination decision of the Constitutional Court of February 27, 1997, B3881/95). Above all, one would be like this different treatment discriminatory within the meaning of Art14 iVm. Art 8 ECHR, since an "objective and reasonable justification" for this is not apparent because it obviously does not pursue a legitimate aim.

Binding of the legislature to federal constitutional requirements when implementing community law.

In any case, Section 29 of the Aliens Act is to be interpreted in such a way that the residence permit of third country nationals of all EEA citizens, including the residence permit of third-country nationals of Austrian citizens, is subject to uniform (beneficial) regulations. This alone also corresponds to the requirement arising from Art. 8 in conjunction with Art. 14 of the ECHR to guarantee the rights and freedoms laid down in the ECHR without discrimination.

And

The problem of reverse discrimination is a matter of internal law of each Member State. In Austria, Belgium and Italy, nationals are protected against reverse discrimination by the national constitution or by the case law of the constitutional court.[Hartkamp, Sieburgh, Devroe (n 4), Case 4.14 (IT).] The effect is that a private party may enjoy similar protection under national law as nationals of other Member States would derive from EU law.

=== Belgium ===
Belgium avoid reverse discrimination.

“Union citizen” (Article 2(1)) Article 40 §2 LAT transposes the Directive’s definition of Union citizen but excludes Belgian citizens.

However, Article 40 ter LAT extends the scope of the legislation to family members of a Belgian citizen in order to avoid reverse discrimination.

Main particularities of the Belgian legal system relating to the transposition of the Directive 2004/38

EDIT: need citation and link to Belgium Law

Measures transposing Directive 2004/38 are adopted at the federal level. Article 5, § 1, II, 3° ‘de la loi spéciale du 8 août 1980 de réformes institutionnelle’ provides that: “§ 1er. Les matières personnalisables visées à l'article 59bis, § 2bis, de la Constitution, sont: II. En matière d'aide aux personnes: 3o La politique d'accueil et d'intégration des immigrés.”

=== Bulgaria ===
Bulgaria created reverse discrimination

The problem of reverse discrimination in Bulgaria has persisted since accession to the EU and currently the issue is an object of a pending application against Bulgaria before the European Court of Human Rights, as well as on the agenda of the national institutions.

=== Croatia ===
We have no supporting data, study, or law papers, other than this paper, which suggests Croatia, like Spain, avoided reverse discrimination.

European Journal of Migration and Law (2019)

EU Citizens, Foreign Family Members and European Union Law

In 2015 the law was widened to include the EU group of family members entitled to facilitation for entry to join also Spanish nationals who had not exercised an EU free movement right. This was also the case in Croatia

=== Cyprus ===
Cyprus avoid reverse discrimination, albeit after the Supreme Court of Cyprus ruled that it was absurd to create two separate categories, one for EU citizens and one for Cypriots, where Cypriots would have less rights.

Details here and here

The case law of the Supreme Court of Cyprus has dealt with this issue (Case 1241/06). It has handed down several judgments The cited judgment has stated that it would be absurd to create two separate categories of protection, one for EU citizens and one for Cypriots. Quote from Supreme Court of Cyprus, Review Jurisdiction, Case 1241/06

=== Czechia ===
Czechia avoid reverse discrimination.

Sect 15a(5) states that the provisions of this Act pertaining to the family member of a European Union citizen also apply to an alien who is a family member of a citizen of the Czech Republic. A contrario, provisions of AA will never be applicable to Czech citizens regardless whether they have exercised or not the right of free movement.

In 2009 the Czech Supreme Administrative Court held that the position of EU citizen´s family members and Czech citizen´s family members in the respective law must be identical, otherwise it would constitute a discriminatory treatment.

=== Denmark ===
Denmark created reverse discrimination in their Aliens (Consolidation) Act No. 945 of 1 September 2006 by limiting rights to aliens from other Member states.

Studies of reverse discrimination in Denmark compared cost and processing time for family reunification. Danish citizens under National law pay 20,000 euro and wait 10 months, while EU citizens are free, the maximum delay by EU law is limited to 90 days.

=== Estonia ===
Estonia avoid reverse discrimination.

Family members of Estonian citizens have more generous rights under Estonian law than the Directive;

In practice EU citizens and their family members and Estonian citizen and their family members are treated in line with the Directive.

=== Finland ===
Finland created discrimination in their implementation

Despite the differences between the treatment of family members of Finnish citizens who come within the scope of free movement and those remaining outside of it, the issue of reverse discrimination has not raised any considerable debate in Finland.

Aliens Act (2004, as amended by Act 360/2007)

The provisions in chapter 10 cover family members of Finnish citizens, only if the Finnish citizen has already made an earlier use of the right of movement – Chapter 10, Section 153, Subsection 4)

(4) The Chapter applies to family members of a Finnish citizen if the Finnish citizen has exercised his or her right of free movement under the Directive by settling in another Member State, and the family member accompanies him or her to Finland or joins him or her later. (432/2010)

=== Germany ===
Germany created reverse discrimination in their law, Zuletzt geändert durch Art. 7 G v. 26.2.2008 I 215 as follows

Germans who have not made use of their right to free movement are subject to national law (Aufenthaltsgesetz). thereby limiting freedom of movement rights to only Germans who have already exercised earlier freedom of movement right.

The German courts have ruled that reverse discrimination does not violate equal treatment as required under the German Constitution, nor fundamental rights or Article 7(2) of the Family Reunification Directive.

Before the CJEU had handed down its ruling in McCarthy, the Bavarian Administrative Court had ruled that dual nationals who are born in Germany and have never exercised free movement rights derive no rights from EU law if they apply for family reunification with a third-country national.

=== Greece ===
Greece avoided reverse discrimination

"As far as the question of reverse discrimination due to the implementation of EU law is concerned, the answer is that we can distinguish two distinct periods in the jurisprudence of the Greek courts. Since 2009, the relevant jurisprudence has changed and reverse discrimination due the implementation of EU law is considered to be unacceptable. The main doctrinal arguments which have led to this shift are founded on the equality principle provided by the Greek Constitution (Art. 4). However, this shift in the jurisprudence does not imply an automatic implementation of EU law with regard to Greek citizens. It only implies that the judge is obliged to examine whether or not the differential treatment between EU and Greek citizens can be justified according to the equality principle"

=== Hungary ===
Hungary avoided reverse discrimination in their implementation.

Transposition of Directive 2004/38/EC is the result of the adoption of the Free movement Act (a szabad mozgás és tartózkodás jogával rendelkező személyek beutazásáról és tartózkodásáról szóló 2007. évi I. törvény) and of the implementing Government Decree 113/2007 (V. 24.) (a szabad mozgás és tartózkodás jogával rendelkező személyek beutazásáról és tartózkodásáról szóló 2007. évi I. törvény végrehajtásáról szóló 113/2007. (V. 24.) Korm. rendelet), which took effect on 1 July 2007.

The Hungarian legislation (Act I of 2007 on the Entry and Stay of Persons Enjoying the Right of Free Movement) prescribes the same provisions when it comes to the right of entry and residence of less than three months of the family members of an EEA citizen and those of a Hungarian citizen.

With regard to "spouses" (Article 2(2)(a)), points ba) and bb) of Article 2 of the FMA enables "the spouse of a Hungarian national" to benefit from the application of the Directive, without excluding the spouses of sedentary Hungarians

=== Ireland ===
Ireland implemented a policy of reverse discrimination

Irish family members need to apply for a visa,

EU/EEA or Swiss family members receive a residence card, that enables visa free travel.

The only vague discrimination in the legislation, is not referring to Irish Citizens, but to the Irish State not being in the EU. SI 656 of 2006 defines "Member State" means a Member State of the European Union other than the State.

The Irish Law says, the privileges apply to Union citizens, it did not exclude Irish citizens. Nor put any conditions on Irish citizens.. Ireland is the ONLY Union State to implement reverse discrimination without the clear domestic legislation and subsequent legislative approval.

The Irish Law SI 656 of 2006 later amended by SI 310 of 2008 says

Application and transitional provisions

3. (1) These Regulations shall apply to –

(a) Union citizens,

(b) subject to paragraph

(2), qualifying family members of

Union citizens who are not themselves Union citizens, and

(c) subject to paragraph

(2), permitted family members of Union citizens

The Reverse Discrimination implemented in Ireland against Irish families in contrast to the Irish Constitution on Marriage and Family

THE FAMILY

ARTICLE 41

1 1° The State recognises the Family as the natural primary and fundamental unit group of Society, and as a moral institution possessing inalienable and imprescriptible rights, antecedent and superior to all positive law.

2° The State, therefore, guarantees to protect the Family in its constitution and authority, as the necessary basis of social order and as indispensable to the welfare of the Nation and the State

=== Italy ===
Avoided reverse discrimination by transposing EU directive 2004/38/EC into National Law Article 23 of 30/2007

which says

In English

Art. 23.

Applicability to non-Italian citizens who are family members of Italian citizens

1. The provisions of this legislative decree, if more favorable, apply to family members of Italian citizens who do not have Italian citizenship

In Italian

“Art. 23.

Applicabilità ai soggetti non aventi la cittadinanza italiana che siano familiari di cittadini italiani

1. Le disposizioni del presente decreto legislativo, se più favorevoli, si applicano ai familiari di cittadini italiani non aventi la cittadinanza italiana.

And Further, in 2012, reverse discrimination against Italian citizens was specifically banned in national law.

Law No 234 of 24 December 2012

Article 53 of legge n. 234

‘Rules of the Italian legal order or domestic practices which have a discriminatory effect with respect to the condition and treatment guaranteed in Italy to citizens of the European Union are not to be applied to Italian citizens.’

=== Latvia ===
Latvia created reverse discrimination

National immigration law provides more restrictive definition of family member than EU law. The Immigration law recognizes as a family member of Latvian citizen or Latvian non-citizen spouse, minor children, minor children of a spouse and parents. Listed family members may require residency permit with a view to permanent stay. However, there are certain restrictions. Parents may obtain residency permit if they have attained pensionable age and do not require any social assistance. Children have residency right until attainment of majority, which is 18 years of age. In case of divorce or death of spouse – Latvian citizen or Latvian non-citizen, spouse of deceased person loses residency rights, unless he/she has minor child – Latvian citizen or Latvian non-citizen. Consequently, national immigration law creates reverse discrimination against Latvian citizens in a pure internal situation.

=== Luxembourg ===
Luxembourg avoid reverse discrimination.

Article 2(1) 1 defines a “Union citizen” as “any person having the nationality of a Member State”. Article 3, b) Prop states that a Union citizen is ‘toute personne ayant la nationalité d’un Etat membre de l’Union européenne qui exerce son droit à la libre circulation’. Every person with the nationality of a Member State is therefore considered a Union citizen for the application of the Prop. This also includes citizens of Luxembourg (see transposition of Article 3(1) of the Directive). The Prop does not say that only ‘foreigners’ with the nationality of a Member State will be considered a Union citizen.

=== Malta ===
Malta avoid reverse discrimination.

2.1 Definitions, family members and beneficiaries Definitions: the concept of family members (Article 2)

Practically all definitions have been fully and accurately transposed into national law. There seems to be some doubts with regard to the definition of Union Citizen, because under LN 191 of 2007 this has been defined as “any person having the nationality of a MS, but does not include Maltese nationals”. But in fact the law has been drafted like this because the treaty right of free movement for Maltese citizens is already granted under the supreme law of Malta i.e. the Constitution and this was before the actual Directive was adopted in Malta

=== Norway ===
Norway created reverse discrimination in their law

==== Chapter 6 and Chapter 13 Provisions ====
Chapter 6 contains provisions for the family members of Norwegian citizens following alien immigration.

Chapter 13 contains special provisions for the family members of EU/EEA and EFTA citizens.

==== Reverse Discrimination ====
The reverse discrimination created by this treatment includes:

- A fee of NOK 10,500 (around EUR 1,000) that must be paid by Norwegian families, while the families of EU citizens are exempt.
- A minimum income requirement for Norwegian families, where the Norwegian citizen must have an income of at least NOK 300,988 per year, whereas EU citizens face no such requirement.

This creates another layer of discrimination among Norwegians, dividing them into rich and poor families. Poor Norwegian families are denied the right to live with their family members, while wealthy Norwegian families retain legal rights that are inaccessible to their less fortunate compatriots.

==== Differences in Family Immigration Rules ====
There are significant differences between the requirements for family immigration residence permits (when the sponsor is a Norwegian citizen) and those for residence cards issued to family members of EEA nationals.

In particular, Norwegian citizens face:

- Application fees
- Income requirements
- Special age-related rules

These restrictions do not apply when the reference person is an EEA national. Norwegian law establishes a clear separation between these sets of rules, limiting the rights granted to family members of Norwegian citizens who do not benefit from EEA regulations.

=== Poland ===
~~Poland has created reverse discrimination when they transposed 2004/38/EC into Polish National Law~~

To decide if Poland has created or avoided reverse discrimination, we need more information.

In contrast to the Constitution of Poland which was supposed to prevent discrimination.

Constitution of the Republic of Poland

Article 32

1) All persons shall be equal before the law. All persons shall have the right to equal treatment by public authorities.

2) No one shall be discriminated against in political, social or economic life for any reason whatsoever

Analysis

Article 2(1): “Union citizen” According to the Directive, a Union citizen means any person having the nationality of a Member State. In its verdict in Surinder Singh (C-370/90), ECJ said that the rules of free movement shall apply also to citizens of the given Member State (here: Polish citizens) who return to Poland after having resided in another Member State and to their family members. The definition of a Union citizen in the Polish law explicitly excludes Polish citizens (« Union citizen shall mean a foreign national.... »). However, the body of transposing legislation often uses the term “national of a Union Member State”, which is a part of the definition of Union citizens to which the requirement to be a foreign national does not apply. The explicit use of the term “national of a Union Member State” instead of the defined term “Union citizen” indicates that it was the purpose of the legislator not to use the term “Union citizen” which excludes Polish nationals, but rather the larger definition of “nationals of a Union Member States”. As such, it is not explicitly provided for, but certainly not excluded, that the Polish legislation would apply to Polish nationals who have exercised their right to free movement. In any case, Polish citizens in some cases (e.g. right of exit) enjoy rights granted by other laws, e.g. PA; and their family members - rights granted by FA, which however are less beneficial than those provided for by EREA.

=== Portugal ===
Portugal avoided reverse discrimination when they transposed the EU Directive into Portuguese National Law 37/2006 which says the regulations of this law applicable to family members are extendable to family members of citizens of Portuguese nationality, regardless of their nationality.

Article 3.2

Beneficiaries

5. Regulations of this law applicable to family members are extendable to family members of citizens of Portuguese nationality, regardless of their nationality.

=== Slovenia ===
Slovenia avoided reverse discrimination

Slovenia transposed 2004/38/EC into Slovenian National Law in The Aliens Act, Zakon o tujcih, adopted: Ur. I. RS, nr. 61/99 (amended: Ur.l.RS, nr. 9/01, 87/02, 96/02, 93/05 in 79/06, 111/07, 44/08, 06/11)

Slovenia has a similar Law to Ireland, yet didn't implement discrimination.

Family members of Slovenian nationals enjoy equal rights to family members of EU nationals. In Slovenian aliens legislation both categories are treated equally and granted rights as stipulated in the Directive 2004/38/EC for family members of EU nationals.

Article 3

(1) Family members of EU or EEA nationals shall, regardless of their citizenship, be the following:

– spouses;

– unmarried children of up to 21 years of age;

– unmarried children of the spouse of up to 21 years of age;

– unmarried children aged 21 and above and the parents whom EU or EEA nationals are liable to support according to the legislation of the country in which they are citizens;

– unmarried children aged 21 and above and the parents of the spouse whom the spouse of a EU or EEA national is liable to support according to the legislation of the country in which he or she is a citizen;

– the parents of EU or EEA nationals until the latter reach 21 years of age.

(2) According to these Rules, family members of EU or EEA nationals shall also be any other relatives who, for family reunion reasons, have received a residence permit from a competent body in the Republic of Slovenia.

=== Spain ===
Spain avoid reverse discrimination, and clarified this in the amendment to their National Law which transposed EU directive 2004/38/EC.

Spanish Laws 240/2007 amended by 1161/2009

GIVEN BY THE ROYAL DECREE 1161/2009, of 10 July (BOE No.. 177 of 23 July) which adds "Additional provision twentieth, which says

“Additional provision twentieth. Rules applicable to members of the family of Spanish citizens who are not nationals of a Member State of the European Union or a State party to the Agreement on the European Economic Area.

1. The Royal Decree 240/2007 of 16 February, on entry, free movement and residence in Spain of nationals of the Member States of the European Union and other States party to the Agreement on the European Economic Area, shall apply whatever their nationality, and on terms provided for therein, to the families of Spanish citizen, when they accompany or join them.

=== Sweden ===
Sweden created almost equality, with some reverse discrimination. Family members of a Swedish citizen have, according to Swedish legislation, Aliens Act (2005:716) slightly less rights than other EU citizens.

=== United Kingdom ===
While the UK has exited the EU, it's important to examine it here

UK created reverse discrimination when they transposed EU directive 2004/38/EC into National Law Immigration (EEA) Regulations 2006

Family members of United Kingdom nationals

9. (1) If the conditions in paragraph (2) are satisfied, these Regulations apply to a person who is the family member of a United Kingdom national as if the United Kingdom national were an EEA national.

(2) The conditions are that

(a) the United Kingdom national is residing in an EEA State as a worker or self-employed person or was so residing before returning to the United Kingdom; and(b) if the family member of the United Kingdom national is his spouse or civil partner, the parties are living together in the EEA State or had entered into the marriage or civil partnership and were living together in that State before the United Kingdom national returned to the United Kingdom. (3) Where these Regulations apply to the family member of a United Kingdom national the United Kingdom national shall be treated as holding a valid passport issued by an EEA State for the purpose of the application of regulation 13 to that family member.

=== Summary ===
The following countries avoided reverse discrimination: Belgium, Cyprus, Czechia, Estonia, Greece, Hungary, Italy, Luxembourg, Malta, Portugal, Slovenia, Spain.

The following countries created reverse discrimination: Bulgaria, Denmark, Finland, Germany, Ireland, Latvia, Norway (EEA), Sweden, United Kingdom (before leaving the EU).

The following countries have an unclear status and/or information regarding them is missing: Austria, Croatia, France, Iceland (EEA), Liechtenstein (EEA), Lithuania, Netherlands, Poland, Romania, Slovakia, Switzerland (Schengen).

== Reports and reading ==
What can the Court’s response to reverse discrimination and purely internal situations contribute to our understanding of the relationship between the ‘restriction’ and ‘discrimination’ concepts in EU free movement law by Alina Tryfonidou

REVERSE DISCRIMINATION – HOW FUNDAMENTAL RIGHTS MIGHT BE CHANGED WITHOUT NOTICE by Natalia Wojtyla

Fundamental Rights of EU Citizens in Purely Internal Situations: From Reverse Discrimination to Incorporation by N Jarak

The scope of EU Law in recent ECJ case law: reversing ‘reverse discrimination’ or aggravating inequalities by Nathan Cambien

COMPARATIVE STUDY ON THE APPLICATION OF DIRECTIVE 2004/38/EC OF 29 APRIL 2004 ON THE RIGHT OF CITIZENS OF THE UNION AND THEIR FAMILY MEMBERS TO MOVE AND RESIDE FREELY WITHIN THE TERRITORY OF THE MEMBER STATES

Conformity studies of Member States’ national implementation measures transposing Community instruments in the area of citizenship of the Union FINAL REPORT

European Commission Report, with analysis of reverse discrimination in Europe in 2011-2012

The Phenomenon of Reverse Discrimination: An Anomaly in the European Constitutional Order

The issue of ‘reverse discrimination’ against Irish nationals bringing non-EU-national family members into the state to reside with them is open to further argument. [Irish Law Society Gazette 2010]

The EU Citizenship in Purely Internal Situations and Reverse Discrimination by Erik Kotlárik
