= Sudanese Iraqis =

Sudanese Iraqis came to Iraq in the 20th century as workers, as the Sudanese people had to move to various countries of the Persian Gulf. Research in the 1980s indicated that "almost all" the Sudanese in Iraq identified themselves as "skilled labourers, mechanics, electricians, welders, carpenters, etc",. while other researchers note that towards the end of the 1980s there were 250,000-300,000 Sudanese in Iraq, 3,000 of them in the Iraqi Army.

During the 2003 Iraq invasion, Sudanese Iraqis were among the many "third country refugees" who fled Iraq to refugee camps in Jordan. Human Rights Watch later criticised the International Organization for Migration for allowing Sudanese diplomats from Amman to enter the camps and speak with Sudanese-origin persons, stating such was a breach of international refugee law, particularly as some of these same refugees may previously have fled Sudan.

== See also ==
- Iraq–Sudan relations
