= Freedom of movement for workers in the European Union =

Chapter of the EU acquis communautaire

The freedom of movement for workers is a policy chapter of the acquis communautaire of the European Union. The free movement of workers means that nationals of any member state of the European Union can take up an employment in another member state on the same conditions as the nationals of that particular member state. In particular, no discrimination based on nationality is allowed. It is part of the free movement of persons and one of the four economic freedoms: free movement of goods, services, labour and capital. Article 45 TFEU (ex 39 and 48) states that:

1. Freedom of movement for workers shall be secured within the Community.
2. Such freedom of movement shall entail the abolition of any discrimination based on nationality between workers of the Member States as regards employment, remuneration and other conditions of work and employment.
3. It shall entail the right, subject to limitations justified on grounds of public policy, public security or public health:
  (a) to accept offers of employment actually made;
  (b) to move freely within the territory of Member States for this purpose;
  (c) to stay in a Member State for the purpose of employment in accordance with the provisions governing the employment of nationals of that State laid down by law, regulation or administrative action;
  (d) to remain in the territory of a Member State after having been employed in that State, subject to conditions which shall be embodied in implementing regulations to be drawn up by the Commission.
4. The provisions of this article shall not apply to employment in the public service.

The right to free movement has both 'horizontal' and 'vertical' direct effect, such that a citizen of any EU state can invoke the right, without more, in an ordinary court, against other persons, both governmental and non-governmental.

== History ==
The Treaty of Paris (1951) establishing the European Coal and Steel Community established a right to free movement for workers in these industries, and the Treaty of Rome (1957) provided a right for the free movement of workers within the European Economic Community, to be implemented within 12 years from the date of entry into force of the treaty. The first step towards realizing the free movement of workers was the Council Regulation no. 15 of 1961, which entered into force on 1 September 1961. It gave the nationals of the member states the right to take up employment in another member state provided that there were no nationals of that member state available for the job. The regulation was superseded by another regulation on 1 May 1964, which further extended the right of workers to take up employment in another member state. However, it was not until 8 November 1968, when regulation (EEC) no 1612/68 entered into force, that free movement of workers was fully implemented within the Communities. Through this regulation, the original article 49 of the EEC treaty was implemented, and all nationals of the member states obtained the right to take up employment in another member state on the same conditions as the nationals of that particular member state. The free movement of workers was thus implemented before the twelve-year period stipulated in the EEC treaty had expired. On 16 June 2011, this regulation was replaced by the Free Movement of Workers Regulation 2011. At the time free movement of workers was implemented within the European Communities, the corresponding right already existed within the Benelux (since 1960) and between the Nordic countries (since 1954) through separate international treaties and conventions.

The Directive 2004/38/EC on the right to move and reside freely assembles the different aspects of the right of movement in one document, replacing inter alia the directive 1968/360/EEC. It also clarifies procedural issues, and it strengthens the rights of family members of European citizens using the freedom of movement. According to the official site of the European Parliament, the explanation of the freedom of movement goes as follows:

Freedom of movement and residence for persons in the EU is the cornerstone of Union citizenship, which was established by the Treaty of Maastricht in 1992. Its practical implementation in EU law, however, has not been straightforward. It first involved the gradual phasing out, of internal borders under the Schengen agreements, initially in just a handful of Member States. Today, the provisions governing the free movement of persons are laid down in Directive 2004/38/EC on the right of EU citizens and their family members to move and reside freely within the territory of the Member States. However, the implementation of this directive continues to face many obstacles.

== Definition of "worker" ==
The meaning of 'worker' is a matter of European Union law. "The essential feature of an employment relationship, however, is that for a certain period of time a person performs services for and under the direction of another person in return for which he receives remuneration."

- Purpose: under the European Court of Justice caselaw, the rights of free movement of workers applies regardless of the worker's purpose in taking up employment abroad, so long as the work is not solely provided as a means of rehabilitation or reintegration of the workers concerned into society.
- Time commitment: the right of free movement applies to both part-time and full-time work, so long as the work is effective and genuine and not of such small scale, irregular nature or limited duration to be purely marginal and ancillary.
- Remuneration: a wage is a necessary precondition for activity to constitute work, but the amount is not important. The right to free movement applies whether or not the worker required additional financial assistance from the Member State into which he moves. Remuneration may be indirect quid pro quo (e.g. board and lodging) rather than strict consideration for work.
- Direction of another: where a person is self-employed, he can avail himself of the freedom to provide services and freedom of establishment.

== Extent of the right ==
The right to free movement applies where the legal relationship of employment is entered into in or shall take effect within the territory of the European Community. The precise legal scope of the right to free movement for workers has been shaped by the European Court of Justice and by directives and regulations. Underlying these developments is a tension "between the image of the Community worker as a mobile unit of production, contributing to the creation of a single market and to the economic prosperity of Europe" and the "image of the worker as a human being, exercising a personal right to live in another country and to take up employment there without discrimination, to improve the standard of living of his or her family".

== Discrimination and market access ==
- Groener v Minister for Education, 28 November 1989, 379/87
- Keck and Mithouard, 24 November 1993, C-267/91 and C-268/91, ECLI:EU:C:1993:905
- Judgment of the Court of 26 January 1999. F.C. Terhoeve v Inspecteur van de Belastingdienst Particulieren/Ondernemingen buitenland

== Public service exception ==
- Case 149/79 Commission v Belgium [1980] ECR 3881
- Case 152/73 Sotigiu v Deutsche Bundespost [1974] ECR 153

== Directives and regulations ==
- Council Directive 68/360/EEC of 15 October 1968 on the abolition of restrictions on movement and residence within the Community for workers of Member States and their families
- Case 48/75 Royer [1976] ECR 497
- Case 118/75 Watson and Belmann [1976] ECR 1185
- Case C-292/89 Antonissen [1991] ECR I-745
- Regulation (EEC) No 1612/68 of the Council of 15 October 1968 on freedom of movement for workers within the Community repealed and replaced by Regulation (EU) No 492/2011 of the European Parliament and of the Council of 5 April 2011 on freedom of movement for workers within the Union Text with EEA relevance
- Case C-207/78 Ministere Public v Even and ONPTS [1979] ECR 2019
- Case C-267/83 Diatta v Land Berlin [1985] ECR 567
- Case C-370/90 R (Secretary of State for the Home Department) v Immigration Appeal Tribunal and Surinder Singh [1991] ECR I-4265

== Social rights ==
- Case 293/83 Gravier v City of Liège [1985] ECR 593
- Case C-85/96 Maria Martinez Sala v Freistaat Bayern [1998] ECR I-2691
- Case C-184/99 Rudy Grzelczyk v Centre Public d'Aide Sociale d'Ottignies-Louvain-la-Neuve (CPAS) [2001] ECR I-6193

== Transitional provisions in new member states ==
In the Treaty of Accession 2003, the Treaty of Accession 2005, and the Treaty of Accession 2011, there is a clause about a transition period before workers from the new member states can be employed on an equal, non-discriminatory terms in the old member states. The old member states have the right to impose such transitional period for 2 years, then to decide to extend it for additional 3 years, and then, if there is serious proof that labour from new member states would be disruptive to the market in the old member states then the period can be extended for the last time for 2 more years.

According to the principle of reciprocity, new member states have the right to impose restrictions for all the countries that introduced restrictions and transitional periods to their citizens. Croatia has decided to apply this rule.

== Withdrawal from the European Union ==
The United Kingdom formally left the EU on 31 January 2020, following on a public vote held in June 2016. However a transition period to give time to negotiate a trade deal between the UK and the EU was in place in the interim. The EU–UK Trade and Cooperation Agreement (TCA) was concluded on 24 December 2020.

On 1 January 2021 free movement of persons between the parties ended as it is not incorporated in the TCA or the Brexit withdrawal agreement.

== Freedom of movement in the European Economic Area ==
The citizens of the member states of the European Economic Area (which includes the EU) have the same right of freedom of movement in the EEA as EU citizens do within the Union. Additionally, the European Union, its member states, and Switzerland have concluded a multilateral agreement with the same meaning. The EEA member states outside the EU (Norway, Iceland and Liechtenstein) and Switzerland are treated as "old member states" in regard to the Treaty of Accession of the new EU members, so they can impose such 2+3+2 transitional periods.

=== Switzerland ===
Switzerland initially granted freedom of movement to EEA citizens from 2005 to 2011. It briefly reimposed restrictions in 2012–2013, but lifted them again in 2014. A 2014 Referendum directed the Swiss government to impose permanent quotas on residence/work permits for citizens of all EEA countries except Liechtenstein, starting from 2017 at the latest. However, on 22 December 2016, Switzerland and the EU concluded an agreement that a new Swiss law (in response to the referendum) may require Swiss employers to give priority to Swiss-based job seekers (Swiss nationals and foreigners registered in Swiss job agencies) but does not limit the free movement of EU workers to Switzerland.

=== Liechtenstein ===
Liechtenstein was originally allowed by Protocol 15 of the EEA Agreement to limit free movement of persons from other EEA states until 1 January 1998 and then the measure was subjected to a review which concluded in a declaration by the EEA Council that allowed Liechtenstein to indefinitely limit free movement of persons from other EEA states pursuant to Article 112 of the EEA Agreement. Liechtenstein imposes quotas for all EEA citizens (issuing 56 residence permits per year) and a separate quota for Swiss citizens (a further 12 residence permits per year).

== Summary ==
Establishment of rights of nationals of each EEA member state to work in each other member state
| The citizens of → can be employed in ↓ starting ↘ | European Union members | | | | | | | | | | | | | | | | | | | | | | | | | | | Other EEA members | | | Switzerland | United Kingdom | The citizens of ← can be employed in ↓ starting ↙ |
| The citizens of → can be employed in ↓ starting ↘ | Austria | Belgium | Bulgaria | Croatia | Cyprus | Czech Republic | Denmark | Estonia | Finland | France | Germany | Greece | Hungary | Ireland | Italy | Latvia | Lithuania | Luxembourg | Malta | Netherlands | Poland | Portugal | Romania | Slovakia | Slovenia | Spain | Sweden | Iceland | Liechtenstein | Norway | Switzerland | United Kingdom | The citizens of ← can be employed in ↓ starting ↙ |
|---|---|---|---|---|---|---|---|---|---|---|---|---|---|---|---|---|---|---|---|---|---|---|---|---|---|---|---|---|---|---|---|---|---|
| Austria | | 1994 | 2014 | 2020 | 2004 | 2011 | 1994 | 2011 | 1994 | 1994 | 1994 | 1994 | 2011 | 1994 | 1994 | 2011 | 2011 | 1994 | 2004 | 1994 | 2011 | 1994 | 2014 | 2011 | 2011 | 1994 | 1994 | 1994 | 1995 | 1994 | 2004 | 1994 | Austria |
| Belgium (Note: See also the parallel, concurrent Benelux Union between Belgium, the Netherlands and Luxembourg.) | 1994 | | 2014 | 2015 | 2004 | 2009 | 1973 | 2009 | 1994 | 1968 | 1968 | 1981 | 2009 | 1973 | 1968 | 2009 | 2009 | 1960 | 2004 | 1960 | 2009 | 1986 | 2014 | 2009 | 2009 | 1986 | 1994 | 1994 | 1995 | 1994 | 2004 | 1973 | Belgium |
| Bulgaria | 2007 | 2007 | | 2013 | 2007 | 2007 | 2007 | 2007 | 2007 | 2007 | 2007 | 2007 | 2007 | 2007 | 2007 | 2007 | 2007 | 2007 | 2007 | 2007 | 2007 | 2007 | 2007 | 2007 | 2007 | 2007 | 2007 | 2007 | 2007 | 2007 | 2007 | 2007 | Bulgaria |
| Croatia | 2020 | 2015 | 2013 | | 2015 | 2013 | 2013 | 2013 | 2013 | 2015 | 2015 | 2015 | 2013 | 2013 | 2015 | 2013 | 2013 | 2015 | 2018 | 2018 | 2013 | 2013 | 2013 | 2013 | 2018 | 2015 | 2013 | 2015 | 2018 | 2014 | 2022 | 2018 | Croatia |
| Cyprus | 2004 | 2004 | 2007 | 2015 | | 2004 | 2004 | 2004 | 2004 | 2004 | 2004 | 2004 | 2004 | 2004 | 2004 | 2004 | 2004 | 2004 | 2004 | 2004 | 2004 | 2004 | 2007 | 2004 | 2004 | 2004 | 2004 | 2004 | 2004 | 2004 | 2005 | 2004 | Cyprus |
| Czech Republic | 2004 | 2004 | 2007 | 2013 | 2004 | | 2004 | 2004 | 2004 | 2004 | 2004 | 2004 | 2004 | 2004 | 2004 | 2004 | 2004 | 2004 | 2004 | 2004 | 2004 | 2004 | 2007 | 2004 | 2004 | 2004 | 2004 | 2004 | 2004 | 2004 | 2005 | 2004 | Czech Republic |
| Denmark (Note: See also the parallel, concurrent Nordic Passport Union between the Kingdom of Denmark (for Denmark and the Faroe Islands), Sweden, Norway, Iceland and Finland.) | 1994 | 1973 | 2009 | 2013 | 2004 | 2009 | | 2009 | 1954 | 1973 | 1973 | 1981 | 2009 | 1973 | 1973 | 2009 | 2009 | 1973 | 2004 | 1973 | 2009 | 1986 | 2009 | 2009 | 2009 | 1986 | 1954 | 1954 | 1995 | 1954 | 2004 | 1973 | Denmark |
| Estonia | 2004 | 2004 | 2007 | 2013 | 2004 | 2004 | 2004 | | 2004 | 2004 | 2004 | 2004 | 2004 | 2004 | 2004 | 2004 | 2004 | 2004 | 2004 | 2004 | 2004 | 2004 | 2007 | 2004 | 2004 | 2004 | 2004 | 2004 | 2004 | 2004 | 2005 | 2004 | Estonia |
| Finland | 1994 | 1994 | 2007 | 2013 | 2004 | 2006 | 1954 | 2006 | | 1994 | 1994 | 1994 | 2006 | 1994 | 1994 | 2006 | 2006 | 1994 | 2004 | 1994 | 2006 | 1994 | 2007 | 2006 | 2006 | 1994 | 1954 | 1954 | 1995 | 1954 | 2004 | 1994 | Finland |
| France | 1994 | 1968 | 2014 | 2015 | 2004 | 2008 | 1973 | 2008 | 1994 | | 1968 | 1981 | 2008 | 1973 | 1968 | 2008 | 2008 | 1968 | 2004 | 1968 | 2008 | 1986 | 2014 | 2008 | 2008 | 1986 | 1994 | 1994 | 1995 | 1994 | 2004 | 1973 | France |
| Germany | 1994 | 1968 | 2014 | 2015 | 2004 | 2011 | 1973 | 2011 | 1994 | 1968 | | 1981 | 2011 | 1973 | 1968 | 2011 | 2011 | 1968 | 2004 | 1968 | 2011 | 1986 | 2014 | 2011 | 2011 | 1986 | 1994 | 1994 | 1995 | 1994 | 2004 | 1973 | Germany |
| Greece | 1994 | 1981 | 2009 | 2015 | 2004 | 2006 | 1981 | 2006 | 1994 | 1981 | 1981 | | 2006 | 1981 | 1981 | 2006 | 2006 | 1981 | 2004 | 1981 | 2006 | 1986 | 2009 | 2006 | 2006 | 1986 | 1994 | 1994 | 1995 | 1994 | 2004 | 1981 | Greece |
| Hungary | 2009 | 2009 | 2009 | 2013 | 2004 | 2004 | 2009 | 2004 | 2006 | 2008 | 2009 | 2006 | | 2004 | 2006 | 2004 | 2004 | 2007 | 2004 | 2007 | 2004 | 2006 | 2009 | 2004 | 2004 | 2006 | 2004 | 2006 | 2009 | 2006 | 2009 | 2004 | Hungary |
| Ireland (Note: See also the parallel, concurrent Common Travel Area between the United Kingdom and Islands and the Republic of Ireland (Great Britain and Islands and all of the island of Ireland).) | 1994 | 1973 | 2012 | 2013 | 2004 | 2004 | 1973 | 2004 | 1994 | 1973 | 1973 | 1981 | 2004 | | 1973 | 2004 | 2004 | 1973 | 2004 | 1973 | 2004 | 1986 | 2012 | 2004 | 2004 | 1986 | 1994 | 1994 | 1995 | 1994 | 2004 | 1923 | Ireland |
| Italy | 1994 | 1968 | 2012 | 2015 | 2004 | 2006 | 1973 | 2006 | 1994 | 1968 | 1968 | 1981 | 2006 | 1973 | | 2006 | 2006 | 1968 | 2004 | 1968 | 2006 | 1986 | 2012 | 2006 | 2006 | 1986 | 1994 | 1994 | 1995 | 1994 | 2004 | 1973 | Italy |
| Latvia | 2004 | 2004 | 2007 | 2013 | 2004 | 2004 | 2004 | 2004 | 2004 | 2004 | 2004 | 2004 | 2004 | 2004 | 2004 | | 2004 | 2004 | 2004 | 2004 | 2004 | 2004 | 2007 | 2004 | 2004 | 2004 | 2004 | 2004 | 2004 | 2004 | 2005 | 2004 | Latvia |
| Lithuania | 2004 | 2004 | 2007 | 2013 | 2004 | 2004 | 2004 | 2004 | 2004 | 2004 | 2004 | 2004 | 2004 | 2004 | 2004 | 2004 | | 2004 | 2004 | 2004 | 2004 | 2004 | 2007 | 2004 | 2004 | 2004 | 2004 | 2004 | 2004 | 2004 | 2005 | 2004 | Lithuania |
| Luxembourg | 1994 | 1960 | 2014 | 2015 | 2004 | 2007 | 1973 | 2007 | 1994 | 1968 | 1968 | 1981 | 2007 | 1973 | 1968 | 2007 | 2007 | | 2004 | 1960 | 2007 | 1986 | 2014 | 2007 | 2007 | 1986 | 1994 | 1994 | 1995 | 1994 | 2004 | 1973 | Luxembourg |
| Malta | 2004 | 2004 | 2014 | 2018 | 2004 | 2004 | 2004 | 2004 | 2004 | 2004 | 2004 | 2004 | 2004 | 2004 | 2004 | 2004 | 2004 | 2004 | | 2004 | 2004 | 2004 | 2014 | 2004 | 2004 | 2004 | 2004 | 2004 | 2004 | 2004 | 2005 | 2004 | Malta |
| Netherlands | 1994 | 1960 | 2014 | 2018 | 2004 | 2007 | 1973 | 2007 | 1994 | 1968 | 1968 | 1981 | 2007 | 1973 | 1968 | 2007 | 2007 | 1960 | 2004 | | 2007 | 1986 | 2014 | 2007 | 2007 | 1986 | 1994 | 1994 | 1995 | 1994 | 2004 | 1973 | Netherlands |
| Poland | 2007 | 2007 | 2007 | 2013 | 2004 | 2004 | 2007 | 2004 | 2006 | 2007 | 2007 | 2006 | 2004 | 2004 | 2006 | 2004 | 2004 | 2007 | 2004 | 2007 | | 2006 | 2007 | 2004 | 2004 | 2006 | 2004 | 2006 | 2007 | 2006 | 2007 | 2004 | Poland |
| Portugal | 1994 | 1986 | 2009 | 2013 | 2004 | 2006 | 1986 | 2006 | 1994 | 1986 | 1986 | 1986 | 2006 | 1986 | 1986 | 2006 | 2006 | 1986 | 2004 | 1986 | 2006 | | 2009 | 2006 | 2006 | 1986 | 1994 | 1994 | 1995 | 1994 | 2004 | 1986 | Portugal |
| Romania | 2007 | 2007 | 2007 | 2013 | 2007 | 2007 | 2007 | 2007 | 2007 | 2007 | 2007 | 2007 | 2007 | 2007 | 2007 | 2007 | 2007 | 2007 | 2007 | 2007 | 2007 | 2007 | | 2007 | 2007 | 2007 | 2007 | 2007 | 2007 | 2007 | 2007 | 2007 | Romania |
| Slovakia | 2004 | 2004 | 2007 | 2013 | 2004 | 2004 | 2004 | 2004 | 2004 | 2004 | 2004 | 2004 | 2004 | 2004 | 2004 | 2004 | 2004 | 2004 | 2004 | 2004 | 2004 | 2004 | 2007 | | 2004 | 2004 | 2004 | 2004 | 2004 | 2004 | 2005 | 2004 | Slovakia |
| Slovenia | 2007 | 2007 | 2007 | 2018 | 2004 | 2004 | 2007 | 2004 | 2006 | 2007 | 2007 | 2006 | 2004 | 2004 | 2006 | 2004 | 2004 | 2007 | 2004 | 2007 | 2004 | 2006 | 2007 | 2004 | | 2006 | 2004 | 2006 | 2007 | 2006 | 2007 | 2004 | Slovenia |
| Spain | 1994 | 1986 | 2009 | 2015 | 2004 | 2006 | 1986 | 2006 | 1994 | 1986 | 1986 | 1986 | 2006 | 1986 | 1986 | 2006 | 2006 | 1986 | 2004 | 1986 | 2006 | 1986 | 2014 | 2006 | 2006 | | 1994 | 1994 | 1995 | 1994 | 2004 | 1986 | Spain |
| Sweden | 1994 | 1994 | 2007 | 2013 | 2004 | 2004 | 1954 | 2004 | 1954 | 1994 | 1994 | 1994 | 2004 | 1994 | 1994 | 2004 | 2004 | 1994 | 2004 | 1994 | 2004 | 1994 | 2007 | 2004 | 2004 | 1994 | | 1954 | 1995 | 1954 | 2004 | 1994 | Sweden |
| Iceland | 1994 | 1994 | 2012 | 2015 | 2004 | 2006 | 1954 | 2006 | 1954 | 1994 | 1994 | 1994 | 2006 | 1994 | 1994 | 2006 | 2006 | 1994 | 2004 | 1994 | 2006 | 1994 | 2012 | 2006 | 2006 | 1994 | 1954 | | 1995 | 1954 | 2004 | 1994 | Iceland |
| Liechtenstein | 1995 | 1995 | 2014 | 2018 | 2004 | 2011 | 1995 | 2011 | 1995 | 1995 | 1995 | 1995 | 2011 | 1995 | 1995 | 2011 | 2011 | 1995 | 2004 | 1995 | 2011 | 1995 | 2014 | 2011 | 2011 | 1995 | 1995 | 1995 | | 1995 | 2005 | 1995 | Liechtenstein |
| Norway | 1994 | 1994 | 2012 | 2014 | 2004 | 2006 | 1954 | 2006 | 1954 | 1994 | 1994 | 1994 | 2006 | 1994 | 1994 | 2006 | 2006 | 1994 | 2004 | 1994 | 2006 | 1994 | 2012 | 2006 | 2006 | 1994 | 1954 | 1954 | 1995 | | 2004 | 1994 | Norway |
| Switzerland (Note: For the countries that joined the European Union before 2004, plus Cyprus and Malta, restrictions on freedom of movement were initially lifted on 1 June 2007, but Switzerland decided to reimpose them from 1 June 2013 to 31 May 2014 under the safeguard clause of the Agreement on the Free Movement of Persons (AFMP) with the EU. Similarly, for the countries that joined the EU in 2004, except Cyprus and Malta, restrictions on freedom of movement were initially lifted on 1 May 2011, but Switzerland decided to reimpose them from 1 May 2012 to 30 April 2014 under the safeguard clause. Also, according to the Protocol to the Agreement between the European Community and Switzerland regarding the participation of Bulgaria and Romania, Switzerland applied the 2+3+2 transitional period formula to these two countries starting from 1 June 2009. Restrictions were consequently lifted on 1 June 2016, but Switzerland decided to reimpose them from 1 June 2017 to 31 May 2019 under the safeguard clause. Switzerland decided in November 2022 to invoke the safeguard clause for 2023 with respect to Croatia. Switzerland's right to invoke the safeguard clause expires at the end of 2026.) | 2007 | 2007 | 2016 | 2022 | 2007 | 2011 | 2007 | 2011 | 2007 | 2007 | 2007 | 2007 | 2011 | 2007 | 2007 | 2011 | 2011 | 2007 | 2007 | 2007 | 2011 | 2007 | 2016 | 2011 | 2011 | 2007 | 2007 | 2007 | 2005 | 2007 | | 2007 | Switzerland |
| United Kingdom | 1994 | 1973 | 2014 | 2018 | 2004 | 2004 | 1973 | 2004 | 1994 | 1973 | 1973 | 1981 | 2004 | 1923 | 1973 | 2004 | 2004 | 1973 | 2004 | 1973 | 2004 | 1986 | 2014 | 2004 | 2004 | 1986 | 1994 | 1994 | 1995 | 1994 | 2004 | | United Kingdom |

no restriction on freedom of movement of workers; year of initial lifting of restrictions
Liechtenstein imposes a permanent annual quota on residence permits issued, for all EEA citizens and (separately) Swiss citizens
restricted movement of workers reintroduced from 2021; year of initial lifting of restrictions

== See also ==
- Trans-Tasman Travel Arrangement
- Compact of Free Association
- Law of the European Union
- European Union citizenship
- Immigration (European Economic Area) Regulations]]
- European single market
- Citizens' Rights Directive, or Free Movement of Citizens Directive
- Freedom of movement
- Free movement protocol
