= Comprehensive Migration and Mobility Partnership =

Bilateral agreement between India and Germany

The Comprehensive Migration and Mobility Partnership is a bilateral agreement between the countries of India and Germany as a guidance for the citizens of these countries in the areas of studies, research and mutual work. The agreement was signed by S. Jaishankar, External Affairs minister of India and Annalena Baerbock, Foreign Minister of Germany during the latter's visit to India on 5 December 2022.

== History and objectives ==
The Comprehensive Migration and Mobility Partnership was an agreement entered into on 5 December 2022 between India and Germany to encourage the citizens of each country to study, work or do research in the other.

== Provisions ==
The partnership annually allows 3,000 students to be given extended residence permits for 18 months in an Academic Evaluation Centre based in New Delhi, with a multiple entry, short-stay liberalised visa and a systematic procedure on readmission.

== Impact ==
The Comprehensive Migration and Mobility Partnership is intended to help students of both countries in student exchange and interaction between Indian and German students.

== See also ==
- Partnership
