= Foreign worker =

Person working in a country where they do not have citizenship

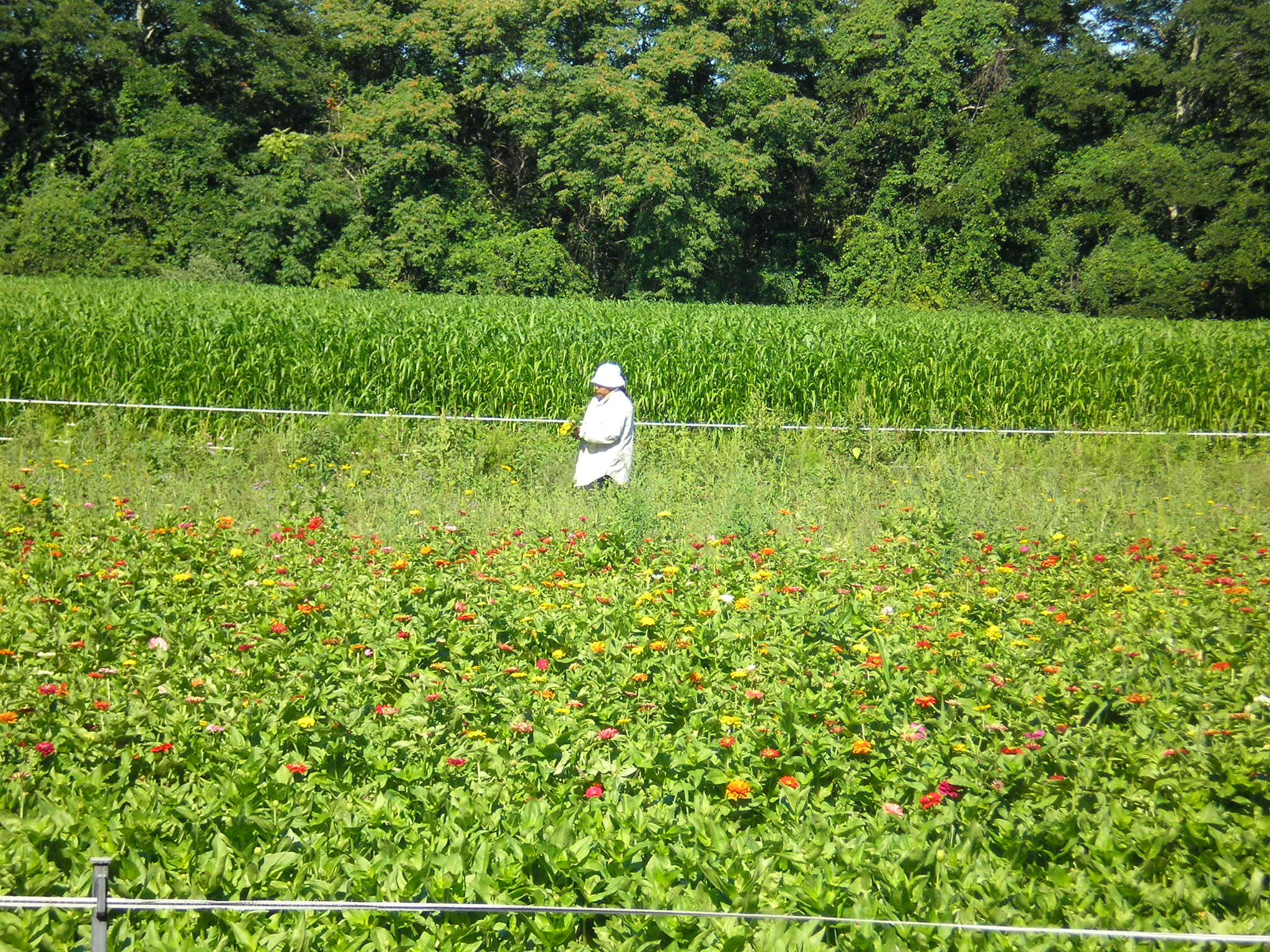
Foreign farmworker in New York

Foreign workers or guest workers are people who work in a country other than one of which they are a citizen. Some foreign workers use a guest worker program in a country with more preferred job prospects than in their home country. Guest workers are often either sent or invited to work outside their home country or have acquired a job before leaving their home country, whereas migrant workers often leave their home country without a specific job in prospect.

Tens of millions of people around the world operate as foreign workers. In 2025, foreign-born people accounted for 19.1 percent of the United States civilian labor force. Their annual unemployment rate was 4.2 percent, compared with 4.3 percent for native-born workers. The Bureau of Labor Statistics cautioned that the 2025 estimates used 11 monthly observations because the October survey was not collected during a federal government shutdown, making the annual figures not strictly comparable with other years. In 2016, over 15 million foreign workers lived in the European Union, half a million in Japan, and around 5 million in Saudi Arabia. Between January and June in 2019, 2.4 million foreigners arrived to work in Russia. In some cases, large numbers of dependents accompany international workers, though this tendency varies with ethnicity – for instance, Arab non-nationals are more likely than Asian ones to bring their families to Arab states in the Persian Gulf region.

Some foreign workers migrate from former colonies to a former colonial metropole (France, for example). Chain migration may operate in building guest-worker communities.

== Foreign workers by country or broader region ==
=== Canada ===
Foreign nationals are permitted to enter Canada on a temporary basis if they have a student visa, are seeking asylum, or possess special permits. The largest category, however, is called the Temporary Foreign Worker Program (TFWP), under which workers are brought to Canada by their employers for specific jobs. In 2000, the Immigrant Workers Centre was founded in Montreal, Québec. In 2006, 265,000 foreign workers worked in Canada. Amongst those of working age, there was a 118% increase from 1996. By 2008, the intake of non-permanent immigrants (399,523, the majority of whom are TFWs) had overtaken the intake of permanent immigrants (247,243). To hire foreign workers, Canadian employers must complete a Labour Market Impact Assessment administered by Employment and Social Development Canada.

=== United States ===
The United States issues a number of employment-based immigrant visas. These include the H-1B visa to employ foreign workers in speciality occupations temporarily and the H-2A visa for temporary agricultural work.

Over one million undocumented immigrants work in agriculture in the United States, while roughly 250,000 are admitted under the H-2A visa, as of 2019.

Green card workers are individuals who have requested and received legal permanent residence from the government in the United States and intend to work in the United States permanently. The United States’ Diversity Immigrant Visa Lottery program authorises up to 50,000 immigrant visas to be granted each year. This help facilitates foreign nationals with low rates of immigration to the United States a chance to participate in a random drawing for the possibility of obtaining an immigration visa.

=== Germany ===
In Nazi Germany, from 1940 to 1942, Organization Todt began its reliance on guest workers, military internees, Zivilarbeiter (civilian workers), Ostarbeiter (Eastern workers) and Hilfswillige ("volunteer") POW workers.

The significant migration phase of labour migrants in the 20th century began in Germany during the 1950s, as the sovereign Germany, since 1955 after repeated pressure from NATO partners, has yielded to the request for closure of the so-called 'Anwerbe' Agreement (German: Anwerbeabkommen).

The initial plan was a rotation principle: a temporary stay (usually two to three years), followed by returning to their homeland. The rotation principle proved inefficient for industry because inexperienced ones constantly replaced experienced workers. The companies asked for legislation to extend the residence permits. Many foreign workers were followed by their families in the following period and stayed. Until the 1970s, more than four million migrant workers and their families thus came to Germany, mainly from the Mediterranean countries of Italy, Greece, the former Yugoslavia and Turkey.

Since about 1990, the disintegration of the Soviet bloc and the enlargement of the European Union allowed guest workers from Eastern Europe to Western Europe.

Some host countries set up a program to invite guest workers, as did West Germany from 1955 to 1973, when over one million guest workers (German: Gastarbeiter) arrived, mostly from Turkey.

=== Switzerland ===
The underestimation of the required integration services by the state and the host countries' society and by the migrants themselves. Switzerland's transformation into a country of immigration was not until after the accelerated industrialization in the second half of the 19th century. Switzerland was no longer a purely rural Alpine area but became a European vanguard in various industries at that time, first of textile, later also the mechanical and chemical industries. Since the middle of the 19th century, mainly German academics, self-employed and craftsmen, but also Italians, who found a job in science, industry, construction and infrastructure construction migrated to Switzerland.

=== Asia–Pacific ===
In Asia, some countries in South and Southeast Asia offer workers. Their destinations include Japan, South Korea, Hong Kong, Taiwan, Singapore, Brunei and Malaysia. A 2020 Greenpeace investigation found significant evidence for the abuse of foreign laborers in the Taiwanese distant water fishing industry. Taiwanese conglomerate FCF was specifically singled out for links to illegal fishing and forced labor.

Foreign workers from selected Asian countries, by destination, 2010–11: Thousands
	Source Country								
Destination	Nepal	Bangladesh	Indonesia	Sri Lanka	Thailand	India	Pakistan	Philippines	Vietnam
Brunei	0	2	11	0	3	1	66	8	
Taiwan			76		48			37	28
Hong Kong	0		50	0	3		22	101	
Malaysia	106	1	134	4	4	21	2	10	12
Singapore	0	39	48	1	11		16	70	
Japan	1	0	2	0	9		45	6	5
South Korea	4	3	11	5	11		2	12	9

=== China ===
Foreign workers in China are subject to employment approval procedures that control who may work and what positions they can hold. China’s Foreign Worker Employment Administrative Rules require employers to obtain authorization before employing a foreign worker and limit hiring to specific authorized occupations. Under the Rules, foreign nationals need to enter China on a Z visa and obtain both a work permit and residence permit before starting work. Employers are required to apply for work permits on behalf of foreign workers after their arrival, which the worker can then use to apply for their residence permit.

=== Arab States of the Persian Gulf ===
In 1973, an oil boom in the Gulf Cooperation Council (Note: The Gulf Cooperation Council is composed of the UAE, Oman, Saudi Arabia, Qatar, Kuwait, and Bahrain.) created an unprecedented demand for labour in the oil, construction and industrial sectors. Development demanded a labor force. This demand was met by foreign workers, primarily those from the Arab states, with a later shift to those from Asia-Pacific countries. A rise in the standards of living for citizens of western Asian countries also created a demand for domestic workers in the home.

Since the 1970s, foreign workers have become a large percentage of the population in most nations in the Persian Gulf region. Growing competition with nationals in the job sector, along with complaints regarding the treatment of foreign workers, has led to rising tensions between the national and foreign populations in these nations.

Remittances are becoming a prominent source of external funding for countries that contribute foreign workers to the GCC countries. On average, the top recipients globally are India, the Philippines, and Bangladesh. In 2001, $72.3 billion was returned as remittances to the countries of origin of foreign workers, equivalent to 1.3% of the world GDP. The source of income remains beneficial as remittances are often more stable than private capital flows. Despite fluctuations in the economy of GCC countries, the amount of dollars in remittances is usually stable.

The spending of remittances is seen in two ways. Principally, remittances are sent to the families of guest workers. Though often put towards consumption, remittances are also directed to investment. Investment is seen to lead to the strengthening of infrastructure and facilitating international travel.

With this jump in earnings, one benefit that has been seen is the nutritional improvement in households of migrant workers. Other benefits are the lessening of underemployment and unemployment.

In detailed studies of Pakistani migrants to West Asia in the early 1980s, the average foreign worker was 25–40 years old. Seventy per cent were married, while families accompanied only 4 per cent. Two-thirds hailed from rural areas, and 83 per cent were production workers. At the time, 40 per cent of Pakistan's foreign exchange earnings came from its migrant workers.

Domestic work is the single most important category of employment among women migrants to the Persian Gulf region, Lebanon and Jordan. The increase of Arab women in the labour force, and changing conceptions of women's responsibilities, have resulted in a shift in household responsibilities to hired domestic workers. Domestic workers perform an array of work in the home: cleaning, cooking, child care, and eldercare. Common work traits include an average 100-hour work week and virtually non-existent overtime pay. Remuneration differs greatly according to nationality, oftentimes depending on language skills and education level. This is seen with Filipina domestic workers receiving a higher remuneration than Sri Lankan and Ethiopian nationals.

Saudi Arabia is the largest source of remittance payments in the world. Similar to other GCC countries, remittance payments from Saudi Arabia rose during the oil boom years of the 1970s and early 1980s but declined in the mid-1980s. As oil prices fell, budget deficits mounted, and most governments of GCC countries put limits on hiring foreign workers. Weaknesses in the financial sector and government administration impose substantial transaction costs on migrant workers who send them. Although difficult to estimate, costs consist of salaries and the increased spending required to expand educational and health services, housing, roads, communications, and other infrastructure to accommodate the basic needs of the newcomers. The foreign labour force is a substantial drain of the GCC states' hard currency earnings, with remittances to migrants' home countries in the early 2000s amounting to $27 billion per year, including $16 billion from Saudi Arabia alone. It has been shown that the percentage of the GDP that foreign labour generates is roughly equal to what the state has to spend on them.

The main concerns of developed countries regarding immigration centres are:

1. the local job seekers' fear of competition from migrant workers
2. the fiscal burden that may result on native taxpayers for providing health and social services to migrants
3. fears of erosion of cultural identity and problems of assimilation of immigrants
4. national security

In immigrant-producing countries, individuals with less than a high school education continue to be a fiscal burden to the next generation. Skilled workers, however, pay more in taxes than what they receive in social spending from the state. The emigration of highly skilled workers has been linked to skill shortages, reductions in output, and tax shortfalls in many developing countries. These burdens are even more apparent in countries where educated workers largely emigrated after receiving a highly subsidised technical education. "Brain Drain refers to the emigration (out-migration) of knowledgeable, well-educated and skilled professionals from their home country to another country, [usually because of] better job opportunities in the new country."

As of 2007, 10 million workers from Southeast Asia, South Asia, or Africa live and work in the countries of the Persian Gulf region. Xenophobia in receiving nations is often rampant, as menial work is often allocated only to foreign workers. In host countries, expatriate labour is treated with prejudice despite government attempts to eradicate malpractice and exploitation of workers. Emigrants are offered substandard wages and living conditions and must work overtime without extra payment. Workers or their dependents are not paid due to compensation regarding injuries and death. Citizenship is rarely offered, and labour can oftentimes be acquired below the legal minimum wage. Foreign workers often lack access to local labour markets. Oftentimes these workers are legally attached to a sponsor/employer until completion of their employment contract, after which a worker must either renew a permit or leave the country.

Racism is prevalent towards migrant workers. With an increasing number of unskilled workers from Asia and Africa, the market for foreign workers became increasingly racialised and dangerous, or "dirty" jobs became associated with Asian and African workers noted by the term "Abed", meaning dark skin.

Foreign workers migrate to the Gulf, Lebanon and Jordan as contract workers by means of the kafala, or "sponsorship" system. Migrant work is typically for two years. Recruitment agencies in sending countries are the main contributors of labour to GCC countries. Through these agencies, sponsors must pay a fee to the recruiter and pay for the worker's round-trip airfare, visas, permits, and wages. Recruiters charge high fees to prospective employees to obtain employment visas, averaging between $2,000 and $2,500 in such countries as Bangladesh and India. Contract disputes are also common. In Saudi Arabia, foreign workers must have employment contracts written in Arabic and have them signed by the sponsor and themselves to be issued a work permit. Contracts may be written or oral with other GCC countries, such as Kuwait.

Dependence on the sponsor (kafeel) naturally creates room for violations of the rights of foreign workers. Debt causes workers to work for a certain period of time without a salary to cover these fees. This bondage encourages the practice of international labour migration as women in situations of poverty can find jobs overseas and pay off their debts through work. It is common for the employer or the sponsor to retain the employee's passport and other identity papers as a form of insurance for the amount an employer has paid for the worker's work permit and airfare. Kafeels sell visas to foreign workers with the unwritten understanding that the foreigner can work for an employer other than the sponsor.

When a two-year work period is over, or with a job loss, workers must find another employer willing to sponsor them or return to their nation of origin within a short time. Failing to do this entails imprisonment for violation of immigration laws. Protections are nearly non-existent for migrant workers.

The population in the current GCC states has grown more than eight times during 50 years. Foreign workers have become the primary, dominant labour force in all sectors of the economy excluding the government bureaucracy. With rising unemployment, GCC governments embarked on formulating labour market strategies to improve this situation, create sufficient employment opportunities for nationals, and limit the dependence on expatriate labour. Restrictions have been imposed: the sponsorship system, the rotational system of expatriate labour to limit the duration of foreigners' stay, curbs on naturalization and the rights of those who have been naturalised, etc. This has also led to efforts to improve the education and training of nationals. Localization remains low among the private sector, however. This is due to the traditionally low income the sector offers. Also included are long working hours, a competitive work environment, and a need to recognise an expatriate supervisor, often difficult to accept.

In 2005, low-paid Asian workers staged protests, some violent, in Kuwait, Bahrain, and Qatar for not receiving salaries on time. In March 2006, hundreds of mostly south Asian construction workers stopped work and went on a rampage in Dubai, UAE, to protest their harsh working conditions, low or delayed pay, and general lack of rights. Sexual harassment of Filipina housemaids by local employers, especially in Saudi Arabia, has become serious. In recent years, this has resulted in a ban on the migration of females under 21. Such nations as Indonesia have noted the maltreatment of women in the GCC states, with the government calling for an end to the sending of housemaids altogether. In GCC countries, a chief concern with foreign domestic workers in childcare without the desired emphasis on Islamic and Arabic values.

Possible developments in the future include a slowdown in the growth of foreign labour. One contributor to this is a dramatic change in demographic trends. The growing birth rate of nationals in the GCC states will lead to a more competitive workforce in the future. This could also lead to a rise in the numbers of national women in the workforce.

A report published by human rights organizations in 2022 suggested up to 10,000 migrant workers die annually in the Gulf, with more than half of deaths being unexplained and recorded as due to "natural causes" or "cardiac arrest" with lacking investigations from the Gulf states.

After criticism by human rights groups during the 2022 World Cup, Qatar has underwent several many of which is considered rare in the region with qatar abolishing the kafala system through new labour laws some of these laws abolished is the exit permit enacted a new national minimum wage for all workers, including migrant workers. Many human rights group argue that it is still not enough but the abolishment of the kafala system happens to be impactful in the region. Qatar is seeking to decrese its dependency on foreign workers force by 2030.

=== European Union ===
In 2016, around 7.14% (15.885.300 people) of total EU employment were not citizens, 3.61% (8.143.800) were from another EU Member State, 3.53% (7.741.500) were from a non-EU country. Switzerland 0.53%, France 0.65%, Spain 0.88%, Italy 1.08%, United Kingdom 1.46%, Germany 1.81% (until 1990 former territory of the FRG) were countries where more than 0.5% of employees were not citizens. The United Kingdom 0.91%, Germany 0.94% (until 1990 former territory of the FRG) are countries where more than 0.9% of employees were non-EU countries. countries with more than 0.5% employees were from another EU country were Spain 0.54%, United Kingdom 0.55%, Italy 0.72%, Germany (until 1990 former territory of the FRG) 0.87%.

== See also ==
- Body shops
- Bracero program (historical American guest-worker program)
- Dirty, dangerous and demeaning
  - Mexican Americans
- Exploitation of labour
- Global labor arbitrage
- Global mobility
- Immigration
- Lavoie v. Canada (a Canadian Supreme Court case ruling on foreign worker status)
- Smart contract: can be used for temporary employment contracts
- Mercenary
- Metic
- Schengen Agreement (an EU agreement to open borders)
- Sweatshop
- Third Country National
- Wage slavery
- Work permit
