= R (Bidar) v London Borough of Ealing =

EU law case concerning free movement of citizens

R (Bidar) v London Borough of Ealing, SS for Education and Skills
- European Court of Justice

Decided 15 March 2005
- Full case name: Dany Bidar v London Borough of Ealing and Secretary of State for Education and Skills
- Case: C-209/03
- CelexID: 61983CJ0293
- ECLI: ECLI:EU:C:2005:169
- Language of proceedings: English

Court composition
- Advocate General; General Geelhoed

Keywords
- Free movement of citizens

R (Bidar) v London Borough of Ealing, SS for Education and Skills is an EU law case, concerning the free movement of citizens in the European Union.

== Facts ==
Danny Bidar, was French, and lived with his grandmother in the UK from August 1998, with his mother, who had cancer and died. He attended the local secondary school, and began reading UCL economics in September 2001. He received assistance with tuition fees (following Gravier v City of Liège), but his application for a student loan was refused on the ground that he did not have ‘settled’ status.

AG Geelhoed referred to concerns of "benefit tourism".

== Judgment ==
The Grand Chamber of the Court of Justice held that Bidar could not be denied the student loan on the basis that he did not have settled status. Bidar was an EU citizen, lawfully resident under TFEU art 21, in conjunction with the Persons of Independent Means Directive 90/364 (now the Citizens Rights Directive article 7(1)(b)). He satisfied those conditions. He was entitled under TFEU art 18 to social assistance benefits, and these included maintenance costs through subsidised loans or grants. Student assistance fell within the treaty scope. The English rules were indirect discrimination. It was legitimate for a member state to grant assistance only to those with a degree of integration. The three year rule was compatible with EU law, but the requirement to have settled status was not, because it was impossible for a student from another member state to obtain it.

== See also ==
- European Union law
