= Residence card of a family member of a Union citizen =

Identification card

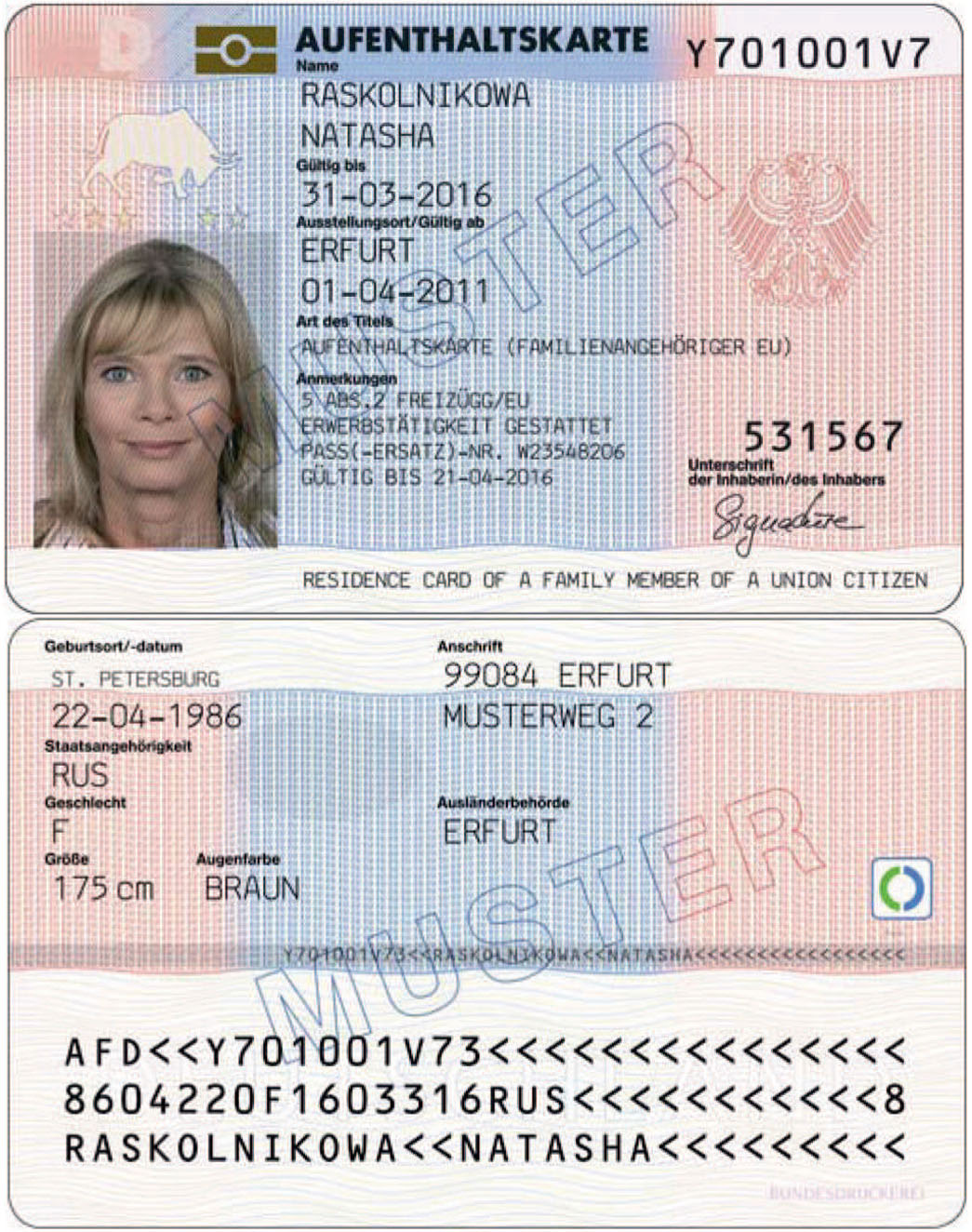
Residence card for a family member of a European Union citizen (German version) from 2011.

European Economic Area (EEA) citizens have the right of free movement and residence throughout the EEA. This right also extends to certain family members, even if they are not EEA citizens. A Residence card of a family member of a Union citizen is issued to the family member to confirm this right of residence. The holder of a valid Residence Card is entitled to use this document in lieu of an entry visa for entry to all EEA member states. There is not a unified format for this card throughout the EU.

In the European Union (EU), a family member's residence card is issued under EU rules by any EU country (except, in common, the country the EU family member is a national of). This exception is not applicable to Spain or Italy, where non-EEA family members of Spanish or Italian citizens will hold a valid Residence card for a family member of a European Union citizen. This exception shall either not apply provided that the EU family member have been genuinely resided in another EU country ("host Member State") being accompanied by a concerned non-EU family member, and now returns to the country of the EU family member's nationality together with that non-EU family member.

The residence card should clearly state that the holder is a family member of an EU national.

People who aren't EEA citizen family members but have a residence permit in the EEA for other reasons will get a similar residence permit card.

Holders of an EU family member's residence card don't need to obtain a visa in the entire EU.

Sample situation: Shu-chuan, the Taiwanese spouse of a German national living in Finland, has been issued an EU family member's residence card in Finland. Shu-chuan and her husband wish to travel to Romania for an autumn break. As Shu-chuan has a valid Taiwanese passport and an EU family member's residence card, she is not required to obtain an entry visa to travel to Romania with her husband.

== Eligibility ==
Qualifying family members of the EU citizen are:

- the spouse
- the registered partner, if the legislation of the host Member State treats registered partnerships as equivalent to marriage
- the direct descendants who are under the age of 21, or are dependents and those of the spouse or partner as defined above
- the dependent direct relatives in the ascending line (parents, grandparents) and those of the spouse or partner.

The term "dependent" is not well-defined across the EU law. European Court of Justice holds that:

the status of 'dependent' family member is the result of a factual situation characterised by the fact that material support for that family member is provided by the Community national who has exercised his right of free movement or by his spouse.

— Case C-1/05 (para 35)

However some EU countries refuse to follow the Court's ruling. For example, Czech Republic defines the "dependent" as someone who is either:

1. systematically preparing for a future profession,
2. cannot systematically prepare for a future profession or perform gainful activities due to illness or injury; or
3. is not capable of performing systematic gainful activities due to a chronic adverse health condition.

== Legal background ==
The Residence Card is defined in articles 9 to 11 of the "Directive 2004/38/EC of the European Parliament and the Council of 29 April 2004 on the right of citizens of the Union and their family members to move and reside freely within the territory of the Member States". The central paragraph is article 10(1):

The right of residence of family members of a Union citizen who are not nationals of a Member State shall be evidenced by the issuing of a document called "Residence card of a family member of a Union citizen" no later than six months from the date on which they submit the application.

So the card only confirms the right of residence, it does not create it. Even without applying for a Residence Card, a qualifying family member has the right of residence, although it may be difficult to prove.

== National rules ==
=== United Kingdom ===
As of 6 April 2015, non-EU family members of an EU/EEA/Swiss citizen who are in possession of a Residence card of a family member of a Union citizen are entitled to enter the United Kingdom without the need to apply for an EEA Family Permit. They only need to provide their passport and residence card at the border. However, UK Border Force officers may request documentary proof of their relation to the EU national family member who would be accompanying them as well, such as a marriage or birth certificate.

In the case of the EU national family member being present in the UK, the non-EU family members should be able to prove that the EU national family member is residing in the UK and whether they have a right of residency in the UK as a qualified person. Therefore, the non-EU family member should be able to demonstrate that the EU national family member has been residing in the UK less than three months (the initial right of residence) and, if more than three months, that they are in the UK as a worker, student or self-employed or self-sufficient person or they have acquired the status of permanent residency after having resided in the UK for five years.

From 1 January 2021 an Article 10 or 20 residence card issued by an EEA member state can no longer be used for travel to the UK.

=== Ireland ===
Ireland calls its Residence Card Stamp 4EUFam (EU Directive 2004/38/EC). Ireland has now implemented this part of the directive in full according with the Immigration Act 2004 (Visas) Order 2011 and consequently it is now possible for family members to gain entry into Ireland with a residence card issued by any member state.

=== Sweden ===
Sweden has Residence cards (Uppehållskort) which are given to family members of Union citizens who are not themselves Union citizens.

== Schengen passport stamping rules for this card ==
| Persons whose travel documents are to be stamped | Persons whose travel documents are not to be stamped |
|---|---|
| Third-country nationals (unless covered by an exemption listed in the right hand column); Family members not holding a residence card issued under Article 10 of Directive 2004/38/EC who are accompanying or joining EU, EEA and Swiss citizens exercising the right of freedom of movement | Citizens of EU and EFTA member states exercising the right of freedom of movement; Third-country nationals holding residence cards issued pursuant to Directive 2004/38/EC. |
