= Free Movement of Workers Regulation 2011 =

The Free Movement of Workers Regulation No. 492/2011 is a European Union law, which specifies the right of workers of any European Union Member State to move to and access employment in another Member State without unjustified discrimination.

== Important elements ==
Article 1
- a national ‘has the right to take up an activity as an employed person, and to pursue such activity, within the territory of another Member State’ like a national.

Article 2
- the right to conclude and perform contracts of employment in accordance with the laws of the host state.

Article 3(1)(a)
- discriminatory provisions against foreign nationals, restricting obtaining work, are not permissible, e.g. on linguistic knowledge

Article 3(1)(b)
- national provisions do not apply where ‘though applicable irrespective of nationality, their exclusive or principal aim or effect is to keep nationals of other Member States away from employment offered’

Article 3(2)
- prohibiting a special recruitment procedure for foreign nationals, restricting ads, or additional requirements of eligibility to register for employment offices.

Article 4(1)
- provisions restricting employment of foreign nationals must not apply to nationals of other member states

Article 4(2)
- if there is a requirement for a minimum number of national workers to be employed, other member state citizens count in that quota.

Article 6(1)
- engagement and recruitment of a worker must not depend on medical, vocational or other criteria that discriminate on grounds of nationality

Article 6(2)
- a migrant worker can be required to take a vocational test when employment is offered.

Article 7(1)
- a migrant worker cannot be treated ‘differently from national workers in respect of any conditions of employment and work, in particular as regards remuneration, dismissal, and should he become unemployed, reinstatement or reemployment.’

Article 7(2)
- workers should receive the same social and tax advantages as national workers.

Article 7(4)
- collective agreement clauses that discriminate are null and void.

== See also ==
- Citizens’ Rights Directive
- European Union law
