= Premium Residency =

Residence permit in Saudi Arabia grants expatriates

- Type of project: Governmental
- Established: 11 May 2019; 7 years ago
- Status: Active
- Website: pr.gov.sa

The Premium Residency, informally known as the Saudi green card, is a residence permit in Saudi Arabia that grants expatriates the right to live, work, and own business and property in the Kingdom without the need for a sponsor. The scheme aims to attract highly skilled and wealthy foreign nationals as well as investors and entrepreneurs. The introduction of the Premium Residency comes as a part of Saudi Arabia's Vision 2030 reform plan, which was announced by Crown Prince Mohammed bin Salman to boost the Saudi economy. The permanent residency is granted for SAR 800,000 (US$213,000 as of 2022) while the one-year renewable residency costs SAR 100,000 ($26,660).

Premium Residency is separate from the iqama residency because it grants more of the rights and privileges given to permanent residents in other countries. Iqama holders must have a Saudi sponsor and must still regularly renew their residence permits. These are issued at the government's discretion, with frequent policy changes affecting renewals. As well, iqama holders must rent property and vehicles from Saudi owners with the sponsor acting as the guarantor. Both forms of residency are currently available.

== Types ==
Premium Residency can be acquired in multiple types and categories:

- Special Talent Residency
- Gifted Residency
- Investor Residency
- Entrepreneur Residency
- Real Estate Owner Residency
- Limited Duration and Unlimited Duration Premium Residency

== Requirements ==
Applicants who meet the qualifications must possess a valid passport and prove they have adequate financial resources. If the applicant is employed in the country, they must maintain their employment status. If not, their Premium Residency will be revoked after a grace period to find alternative employment. Another way to demonstrate financial stability for residency is to invest in approved economic sectors in Saudi Arabia, such as real estate or other areas that generate sufficient local jobs.

The renewable permit is issued for one year and can be renewed indefinitely.

== Benefits ==
Eligible foreigners enjoy some benefits, including recruiting workers, owning businesses, property, and means of transportation. Generally, they will be granted equal rights to Saudis in most cases. The permit does not grant citizenship (see Saudi Arabian nationality law).

Other laws pertaining to non-Saudis, such as restrictions against working in reserved occupations and investing in specific economic sectors, still apply.

== See also ==
Foreign workers in Saudi Arabia
