= Gravier v City of Liège =

European freedom of movement case

- European Court of Justice

Submitted 23 December 1983 Decided 13 February 1985
- Full case name: Françoise Gravier v City of Liège
- Case: C-293/83
- CelexID: 61983CJ0293
- ECLI: ECLI:EU:C:1985:69
- Language of proceedings: French

Court composition
- President; Lord Mackenzie Stuart
- Advocate General; Gordon Slynn

Keywords
- Non-discrimination

Françoise Gravier v City of Liège (C-293/83) was an important freedom of movement case in European law concerning non-discrimination in access to vocational education. It held that an education institution may not discriminate against students in terms of the fees they charge on grounds of nationality.

The judgment did not concern maintenance grants from the government. In order to claim those, the European Court of Justice's (ECJ) decisions in R (Bidar) v London Borough of Ealing and Förster v Hoofddirectie van de Informatie Beheer Groep state that a person can be required to have lived in a country for five years prior to a claim.

== Facts ==
Françoise Gravier, a French national, applied in 1982 to study cartoon drawing at the Académie Royale des Beaux-Arts in the Belgian city of Liège. Gravier was asked to pay 24,622 Belgian francs (approximately 610 euros) as a Minerval (enrolment fee) which was only demanded from foreign students. After refusing to pay the fee, Gravier was rejected by the Académie and her Belgian study visa was revoked.

== Case ==
Gravier argued that the fee breached Article 7 of the 1958 Treaty of Rome (discrimination on the grounds of nationality) and Article 59 (equality in the provision of services). Gravier took the City of Liège to the tribunal of first instance in Belgium. The court ruled that the matter concerned European Community law and that a judgment could not be produced until two points of law had been ruled on by the European Court of Justice (ECJ) in Luxembourg. The case was tried in 1985.

== Judgment ==
On 13 February 1985, the ECJ ruled that:

The imposition on students who are nationals of other member states of a charge, a registration fee or the so-called Minerval, where the fee is not imposed on students who are nationals of the host member state, constitutes discrimination on grounds of nationality contrary to Article 7 of the Treaty [of Rome].

It also ruled that learning cartoon art counted as "vocational training" and thus qualify for the same legal status.

Gravier v. City of Liège is acknowledged as a precedent in European case law. The ECJ further ruled that, although higher education was outside European laws and regulations, the access to it was not. As a result, non-discriminatory access had to be applied by member states for access to professional education. With the later case in 1988, Blaizot v. University of Liège, the ECJ decreed that any education at universities can be counted as professional education.

== See also ==
- Free movement of workers
- Right to education
