= Immigrant Workers Centre =

Social justice organization based in Montreal, Canada

The Immigrant Workers Centre (IWC) is a social justice organization based in Montreal, Québec, Canada.

== History ==
The IWC was founded in 2000 by a small group of Filipino-Canadian workers and their allies. The idea of a centre came from the experience of two of the founders: Tess Tesalona and Marco Luciano. Both had previously worked as union organizers and became aware of the lack of resources available to immigrant workers. The goal of the centre was therefore to provide a place for workers to talk about their situations and provide a critique of unions

== Current activities ==
The Immigrant Workers Centre offers a broad range of activities to immigrant workers and their communities. The organization helps union organizing in workplaces with an important proportion of immigrants. The IWC also provides individual-rights counselling and workshops on issues like the history of labor movement. The Immigrant Workers Centre launched, in 2005, a community festival called MayWorks, dedicated to teaching the community about the struggles of immigrant women through artistic projects. The cultural event took place on Women's day and the centre's goal is to raise awareness to the condition of immigrant women by repeating the festival every year.

== Campaigns ==
The Immigrant Workers Centre initiated many actions related to the North-to-South relocation of production trend that occurred in Montreal since 2003; this tendency resulted in several job losses without proper compensation, especially affecting immigrant employees. The festival consequently adopted an "ethical buying" policy. L’Amour Inc. also followed that pattern of transfers and started to close its operations in the city around 2006 and relocated its factories in South America. Over 600 jobs were lost in the process and former employees, most of whom were immigrants, did not receive compensation. In 2008, the IWC allied with the UNITE HERE union to help laid off workers of manufacturing company Golden Brand get compensation. The company eventually agreed to give $3.5 million to its 540 previous employees but, while this was a historic victory in the clothing industry, most of them still face unemployment On June 12, 2009, the IWC and former textile workers organized a rally at the National Assembly of Quebec to meet with Minister of Employment Sam Hamad and asked for better regulations and retraining programs. Although Hamad promised to remedy the situation and find employment for the laid off immigrant workers, no solutions were actually put in place.

== Research and publication ==
The Immigrant Workers Centre has conducted research, mostly based on real cases brought to them, including the Report on Systemic Discrimination: Employment and Poverty in 2000. In 2009, the book Fight Back: Workplace Justice for Immigrants was published. Drawing on the experience of 50 foreign workers, the book relates the challenges they face when trying to join the workforce in Canada, the exploitation they are victimized by, as well as organizing and activist experiences.
