= Residence permit =

Document or card required to reside in a country

A residence permit (less commonly residency permit) is a document or card required in some regions, allowing a foreign national to reside in a country for a fixed or indefinite length of time. These may be permits for temporary residency, or permanent residency. The exact rules vary between regions. In some cases (e.g. the UK) a temporary residence permit is required to extend a stay past some threshold, and can be an intermediate step to applying for permanent residency.

Residency status may be granted for a number of reasons and the criteria for acceptance as a resident may change over time. In New Zealand the current range of conditions include being a skilled migrant, a retired parent of a New Zealand national, an investor and a number of others.

== Biometric residence permit ==
Some countries have adopted biometric residence permits, which are cards including embedded machine readable information and RFID NFC capable chips.

== Azerbaijan ==
In Azerbaijan, there are two types of residence permits: temporary residence permit and permanent residence permit. According to the law, there is no biometric residence permit.

== China (mainland) ==
Holders of D, Q1, J1, S1, X1 and Z visas must apply for a residence permit at the local PSB within 30 days of entry into China, unless the "Duration of Each Stay" on the visa is marked as 30 days. Members of foreign diplomatic or consular missions in China must also apply for a residence permit at the Ministry of Foreign Affairs (MFA) or local Foreign Affairs Offices (FSOs) within 30 days of entry into China.

A residence permit takes the form of a sticker applied to the inside of one's passport, similar to a visa.

When eligible, one can also apply for a Foreign Permanent Resident ID card.

== Germany ==
See German residence permit.

== France ==
See Permanent residency in France.

== Italy ==
In Italy the permesso di soggiorno is released by the Polizia di Stato 'state police'; it must be requested by the immigrant to be allowed to reside in the country for more than eight days, or more than ninety days if having a visto d'ingresso 'travel visa' for tourism. It is not required for EU citizens.

== Russia ==
A temporary residence permit is issued either as a stamp in the identity document of a foreign national or a stateless person, or as a separate document in a prescribed format.

Temporary residence permits are granted to foreign nationals (or stateless persons) within the limits of quotas established annually by the Government of the Russian Federation.

The law provides for cases in which a temporary residence permit may be obtained outside of these quotas. Such a permit may be issued to a foreign national or a stateless person who:

- Born within the territory of the RSFSR and previously held USSR citizenship, or was born within the territory of the Russian Federation;
- Recognized as incapacitated (unable to work) and has an adult child (son or daughter) with full legal capacity who is a citizen of the Russian Federation;
- Citizen of the Republic of Kazakhstan, Moldova or Ukraine;
- Has at least one parent who is incapacitated (unable to work) and is a citizen of the Russian Federation;
- Married to a citizen of the Russian Federation who resides in the Russian Federation;
- Has made investments in the Russian Federation in an amount established by the Government of the Russian Federation;
- Has entered into military service (for the duration of such service);
- Participant in the State Program for Assisting the Voluntary Resettlement of Compatriots Living Abroad to the Russian Federation, or is a family member of such a participant relocating to the Russian Federation with them;
- Has a child who is a citizen of the Russian Federation;
- Hhas an adult child (son or daughter, aged eighteen or older) who is a citizen of the Russian Federation and has been declared legally incapacitated or of limited legal capacity by a final court judgment. a person under the age of eighteen who is obtaining a temporary residence permit together with a parent (adoptive parent, guardian, or custodian) — a foreign national who is eligible to obtain a temporary residence permit outside of the quota based on the aforementioned grounds;
- Person under the age of eighteen who is obtaining a temporary residence permit based on an application submitted by a parent (adoptive parent, guardian, or custodian) who is a citizen of the Russian Federation;
- Person who has reached the age of eighteen but has been declared legally incompetent or has had their legal capacity limited under the laws of a foreign state, and who is obtaining a temporary residence permit together with a parent (adoptive parent, guardian, or custodian) — a foreign national who is obtaining a temporary residence permit outside of the quota;
- Person who has reached the age of eighteen but has been declared legally incompetent or has had their legal capacity limited under the laws of a foreign state, and who is obtaining a temporary residence permit based on an application submitted by a parent (adoptive parent, guardian, or custodian) who is a citizen of the Russian Federation;
- other cases provided for by federal law.

The procedure for obtaining a temporary residence permit in the Russian Federation involves gathering the required set of documents, depending on the grounds for obtaining the temporary residence permit.

== Singapore ==
See Permanent residency in Singapore.

== Ukraine ==
In Ukraine there are two types of residence permits: temporary residence permit and permanent residence permit. Temporary residence permit is issued, in general, for a period of 1 year provided that there is at least one of legal grounds for temporary stay in Ukraine. Permanent residence equals to immigration.

== United Kingdom ==
A biometric residence permit was a type of card in lieu of visa which allowed a non-British citizen to work and reside in the UK. A biometric residence card was a type of card which allowed European Union Settlement Scheme holders to work and reside in the UK.

Both cards were replaced by a share code by 2025. These cards can no longer be used for travel, but the government still advises holders to keep their expired cards.

== United States ==
See Permanent residence (United States).

== Saudi Arabia ==
See Premium Residency.

== See also ==
- Residence Permit for Hong Kong, Macao, and Taiwan Residents (China)
- Residence card of a family member of a Union citizen (EU)
