= Stamp 4 =

Immigration status in Ireland

Stamp 4 refers to the stamp number, or immigration status, given to an individual with permission to reside in Ireland. It is issued to people on work visas/work authorisations, to the spouse of an Irish citizen, to the spouse of an EU citizen (Stamp 4 EUFam), to refugees, to people with Irish Born Child residency and those with long-term residency status. People granted Stamp 4 status by the Irish Justice, Home Affairs and Migration need to report to their local Garda National Immigration Bureau in order to receive the physical card, or "Certificate of Registration". The card shows the holder's Stamp 4 status, as well as their photograph and other personal details.

== Entitlements ==
A holder of Stamp 4 status is entitled to work in Ireland without a work permit, establish and run a business, and access state funds and services. The status is valid for a given period of time and is renewable. If it or other qualifying statuses are held for over 8 years, the holder may apply to convert to Stamp 5 which allows the same entitlements but with no time limit.

== EU Directive 2004/38/EC ==
Family members of EEA nationals exercising Treaty rights in Ireland in accordance with EU Directive 2004/38/EC, who are not themselves EEA nationals, are required to apply for a "Residence Card of a family member of a Union citizen", as described in Article 10 of the Directive. In Ireland, applications for the Residence Card, are made on form EUTR1 and sent to the EU Treaty Rights Section of the Justice, Home Affairs and Migration. Article 10(1) of the Directive requires that such applications are processed within six months of submission. Once processed, a letter is sent to the applicant, instructing him or her to visit their local Garda National Immigration Bureau (GNIB), in order to receive their Residence Card. The Residence Card comes in the form of a "Certificate of Registration" like any other issued by the GNIB, however a crucial distinction is made in that "Stamp 4 EUFam" is printed as the stamp number. This serves to confirm that the holder is a family member of an EEA national who is resident in Ireland in accordance with Directive 2004/38/EC. The Residence Card is valid for five years.

== Certificate of Registration ==
Stamp 4 EUFam Residence Card

The Certificate of Registration issued by the Garda National Immigration Bureau in Ireland is a "Residence Card of a family member of a Union citizen", as evidenced by "4 EUFam" printed in the "Stamp No:" field. Although this Certificate of Registration is also a Residence Card for the purpose of EU Directive 2004/38/EC (Article 10), all non-EEA nationals resident in Ireland receive a similar card (Certificate of Registration), which displays their own stamp number, in place of "Stamp 4 EUFam". The stamp numbers are 1, 1A, 2, 2A, 3, 4, 4 EUFam, 5 and 6.
