= Foreign national =

Someone in a country who is not a citizen or permanent resident

A foreign national is any person (including an organization) who is not a national of a specific country. For example, in the United States and in its territories, a foreign national is something or someone who is neither a citizen nor a national of the United States. The same applies in Canada.

== Canada ==
The law of Canada divides people into three major groups: citizens, permanent residents, and foreign nationals. Under Section 2 of the Immigration and Refugee Protection of Canada (IRPA), "foreign national means a person who is not a Canadian citizen or a permanent resident, and includes a stateless person."

== United States ==
The term "foreign national" is not defined in the Immigration and Nationality Act (INA), which instead uses the term alien to cover many classes of people who do not qualify as nationals of the United States (Americans).

The term "foreign national" is used in US election laws to describe a person who is prohibited from contributing to federal campaigns. For that purpose, "the term 'foreign national' means... an individual who is not a citizen of the United States or a national of the United States (as defined in section 1101(a)(22) of title 8) and who is not lawfully admitted for permanent residence, as defined by section 1101(a)(20) of title 8."

== See also ==
- Alien (law)
- Nationality
- Immigration
- Naturalization
- Statelessness
- Third country national
