= R (Secretary of State for the Home Department) v Immigration Appeal Tribunal and Surinder Singh =

UK legal case

R (Secretary of State for the Home Department) v Immigration Appeal Tribunal and Surinder Singh (European Court Reports 1992 I-04265; ECLI identifier: ECLI:EU:C:1992:296) is a UK immigration law and EU law case involving the right of entry and residence into a nation state.

== Facts ==
The following facts are based on the official text of the case available on EUR-Lex.

Singh was an Indian national who married Rashpal Purewal, a British national, in October 1982 in Bradford. From 1983 to 1985, both were employed in Germany. In 1985, they relocated to the United Kingdom to open a business. In July 1987, a decree nisi of divorce was granted against Singh following proceedings initiated by his wife. Because of the decree, the British authorities cut short his leave to remain and refused to grant him indefinite leave to remain as the spouse of a British citizen. Mr Singh lawfully resided in the UK until May 1988 and thereafter continued to do so. In December 1988, a deportation order was issued against him under the Immigration Act 1971.

Singh filed an appeal against the order, which was dismissed in March 1989. Subsequently, in August 1989, the Immigration Appeal Tribunal allowed his appeal against the March decision, holding that he had the right to remain in the UK as the spouse of a British citizen. The Secretary of State for the Home Department made a reference to the European Court of Justice for a preliminary ruling. Under EU law [today, Art 3(1) of the Citizens' Rights Directive], a citizen of an EU Member State has the right to move to a Member State other than that of his nationality, and has the right to bring certain family members, including their non-EU national spouse, with them.

== Judgment ==
It was held that Article 52 of the Treaty of Rome and Council Directive 73/148/EEC of 1973 required Member States to grant leave to enter and reside in their territory to the spouses of their citizens, regardless of the nationality of the spouse. The Court emphasized that, "A spouse must enjoy at least the same rights as would be granted to him or her under Community law if his or her spouse entered and resided in another Member State."

== Significance ==
This case established a precedent for British citizens to secure UK immigration rights for their non-European spouses, regardless of the domestic laws of the Member State.

The Surinder Singh route involves living and working elsewhere in the European Economic Area for a period of three or more months (there is no actual time period required by EU law but instead it is based on previous case law and its application) and then asserting the rights associated with EEA citizenship and free movement to gain access to their own country while being covered by European law. In so doing, the route triggers the right of free movement in the EU, even when the domestic statutes put a conditional bar on entry.

In principle, the Surinder Singh route applies to all EU citizens, not just UK citizens. For example, a French husband could bring his Mexican wife to France by exercising his treaty rights in Spain. It also applies to qualifying dependent family members and spouses.There are several petitions circulating throughout the UK and to expats abroad that are asking people to fight this recent "government clarification," and an example is 'British people want equal rights to bring their family to the UK ' on the government petition website.

The Upper Tribunal of the Asylum and Immigration Tribunal, comprising immigration judges Mr Haddon-Cave J and Mr Kopieczek, have since ruled that the Surinder Singh principles apply to unmarried partners (and by analogy, other members of a British returning worker's "extended family"): Kamila Santos Campelo Cain v Secretary of State for the Home Department. (IA/40868/2013).

== Brexit ==
This route to residence has ceased for new applicants following Brexit; however, the existing residency holders do not lose it.

== See also ==
- Directive 2004/38/EC on the right to move and reside freely
- Metock case
