= Third country national =

Person temporarily residing in a country in the process of moving to a third country

Third country national (TCN) is a term often used in the context of migration, referring to individuals who are in transit and/or applying for visas in countries that are not their country of origin (i.e. country of transit), in order to go to a destination country that is likewise not their country of origin. In the European Union, the term is used to refer to individuals who are not citizens of European Union, or other countries whose nationals enjoy free movement within the Union.

In terms of employment, the term is often used to designate "an employee working temporarily in an assignment country, who is neither a national of the assignment country nor of the country in which the corporate headquarters is located."

In the US, it is often used to describe individuals of other nationalities hired by a government or government sanctioned contractor who represent neither the contracting government nor the host country or area of operations. This is most often those performing on government contracts in the role of a private military contractor. The term can also be used to describe foreign workers employed by private industry and citizens in a country such as Kuwait in which it is common to outsource work to non-citizens.

== Refugees ==
According to IRIN,

Unlike refugees who are protected by international conventions, third-country nationals (TCNs), who neither belong to the country of refuge or the one they fled, are not covered by any global rights conventions. It is often up to their governments to look after them and arrange for their repatriation.

== Use of the term in the US ==
Generally speaking, the US government classifies contract personnel under one of three headings:

- Expatriates - those personnel who are of the same nationality as the contracting government. (In Iraq, foreign nationals working as a member of a US contractor are regarded as expatriates)
- TCN (third country national) – those personnel of a separate nationality to both the contracting government and the AO or "area of operations".
- HCNs (host country nationals), LNs (local nationals), Indigs (indigenous personnel) – those personnel who are indigenous to the area of operations.

Examples of this hierarchy are as follows:

Contract personnel being used by the US government to fight the global war on terror in Iraq consist of Expatriates, namely those personnel of US citizenship that represent a private military contractor being contracted by the US Government, Indigenous Iraqi and Kurdish personnel and TCNs such as are currently being employed by many of the private military contracting firms currently under contract.

A TCN living on a US military base near Fallujah, Iraq

TCNs such as have been employed by the United States military (through contractors) for operations in the Middle East for many years. The accommodations, security, and treatment of TCNs can vary greatly from the way that U.S. and multinational coalition personnel are treated. Their contracts often require them to work for four years continuously without a break to return to their home countries. Many TCN contractors have also been lured by preemployment deals that have guaranteed them the job as long as they give a percentage of their pay to an 'employment agent' or 'representative'. TCN housing compounds are generally in less secure areas outside of the main base. As a result, many TCNs in such high-risk areas have been injured or killed, however most military installations will provide life-saving medical care as required.

Since April 2006, the Pentagon now demands that contractors fight labor trafficking and low quality working conditions in Iraq endured by tens of thousands of low-paid south Asians working under US-funded contracts in Iraq.

In an April 19 memorandum to all Pentagon contractors in Iraq and Afghanistan, the Joint Contracting Command demands that the widespread practice of taking away workers passports come to end. Contractors engaging in the practice, states the memo, must immediately "cease and desist."

"All passports will be returned to employees by 1 May 06. This requirement will be flowed down to each of your subcontractors performing work in this theater."

Despite the Pentagon crackdown, civilian contractors still report problems of poor working conditions.

== Use of the term in Europe ==
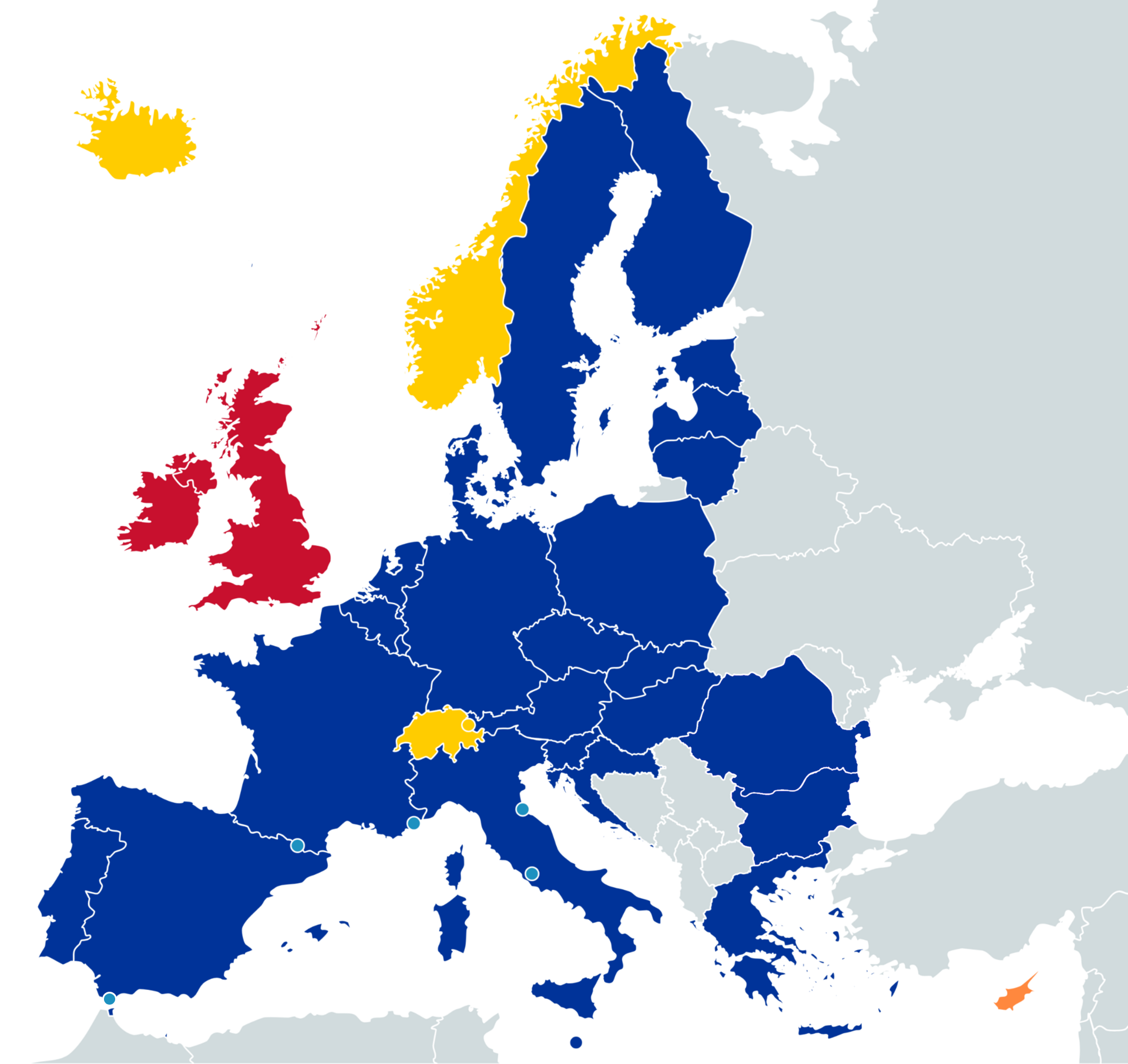
Schengen Area (EU)
Schengen Area (non-EU)
Working to implement later (EU)
Common Travel Area
De facto Schengen participation

*Azores, Madeira and Canary Islands are also in the Schengen Area.

A clickable Euler diagram showing the relationships between various European regional organisations

In Europe, the word third country national is often used for any person who is not a citizen of the European Union within the meaning of Art. 20(1) of TFEU and who is not a person enjoying the European Union right to free movement, as defined in Art. 2(5) of the Regulation (EU) 2016/399 (Schengen Borders Code).

Some European regulations deal with third country national, for instance:

- Art. 3(1) of Directive 2008/115/EC (Return Directive)
- Art. 2(6) of Regulation (EU) 2016/399 (Schengen Borders Code)

Depending on the used definition, people from Norway, Iceland, Liechtenstein (European Economic Area) and Switzerland might be considered as third country national or non third country national.

While EU nationals might have a right to cross internal borders, such right might be more limited for TCN.

- See also Visa policy of the Schengen Area

== See also ==
- Foreign national
- Foreign worker
