= Citizens' Rights Directive =

EU directive defining right of free movement

Directive 2004/38/EC
- European Union directive
- Text with EEA relevance
- Title: Directive on the right of citizens of the Union and their family members to move and reside freely within the territory of the Member States
- Made by: European Parliament and Council
- Made under: Arts 12, 18, 40, 44 and 52 TEC
- Journal reference: L158, pp. 77–123
- EEA Joint Committee decision: 158/2007

History
- Date made: 2004-04-29
- Entry into force: 2004-04-30
- Implementation date: required by 2006-04-29

Other legislation
- Replaces: directives 64/221/EEC, 68/360/EEC, 72/194/EEC, 73/148/EEC, 75/34/EEC, 75/35/EEC, 90/364/EEC, 90/365/EEC and 93/96/EEC
- Amends: regulation (EEC) No 1612/68

The Citizens' Rights Directive 2004/38/EC (also sometimes called the "Free Movement Directive") sets out the conditions for the exercise of the right of free movement for citizens of countries in the European Economic Area (EEA), which includes the member states of the European Union (EU) and the three European Free Trade Association (EFTA) members Iceland, Norway and Liechtenstein. Switzerland, which is a member of EFTA but not of the EEA, is not bound by the Directive but rather has a separate multilateral sectoral agreement on free movement with the EU and its member states.

It consolidated older regulations and directives, and extended the rights of unmarried couples. It gives citizens of EEA countries the right of free movement and residence across the European Economic Area, as long as they are not an undue burden on the country of residence and have comprehensive health insurance. (Note: Article 7(1) of the Directive) This right also extends to close family members that are not citizens of EEA countries.

== Contents ==
The Directive contains the following chapters:

- Chapter I (articles 1–3): General provisions (subject, definitions and beneficiaries)
- Chapter II (articles 4–5): Right of exit and entry
- Chapter III (articles 6–15): Right of residence
- Chapter IV: Right of permanent residence
  - Section I (articles 16–18): Eligibility
  - Section II (articles 19–21): Administrative formalities
- Chapter V (articles 22–26): Provisions common to the right of residence and the right of permanent residence
- Chapter VI (articles 27–33): Restrictions on the right of entry and the right of residence on grounds of public policy, public security or public health
- Chapter VII (articles 34–42): Final provisions

== Scope ==
Pursuant to articles 4 and 5 of the directive, any citizen of an EEA country may leave their own country and enter another EEA state without a visa by presenting a valid passport or national identity card. People unable to present a valid passport or national identity card at the border must be afforded every reasonable opportunity to obtain the necessary documents within a reasonable period of time or corroborate or prove by other means that they are covered by the right of free movement.

The directive applies to any citizen of an EEA country who is moving to and living in an EEA state other than his own (the exclusion is based on the principle of non-interference with purely national issues). However, it also applies when a covered person is moving back to his home country after staying in another EEA state, as defined in the case of Surinder Singh. For dual citizens with two EEA member state nationalities, the directive can apply in any EEA state. Temporary limitations can be put in place for the new member states of the EU.

To be fully covered by the European right of free movement, the EEA citizen needs to exercise one of the four treaty rights:

- working as an employee (this includes looking for work for a reasonable amount of time),
- working as a self-employed person,
- studying,
- being self-sufficient or retired.

These rights are named after the Treaty of Rome, which defines the freedom of movement for workers. They have been extended over time, and are mainly of historical significance by now, since being self-sufficient has been added to the list. As long as a citizen has sufficient money or income not to rely on public funds and holds comprehensive health insurance, they exercise one or more treaty rights. If no treaty right is exercised, the right of free movement is limited to three months.

Family members are also covered by the right of free movement, but only as a dependent of the EEA citizen. The right is limited to the EEA state in which the EEA citizen is exercising treaty rights. In certain cases (e.g. divorce after at least 3 years of marriage where 1 year must have been spent in the host member state), the family member can retain the right of residence. A family member is defined as:

- the spouse,
- the registered partner,
- a child under the age of 21, or
- a dependent child or parent (of the EEA citizen or partner).

There is a second category of extended family members, which can be included at the discretion of national legislation. It covers dependent relatives (especially siblings), dependent household members and unmarried/unregistered partners in a "durable relationship".

== Status ==
The right of free movement is granted automatically when the requirements are fulfilled, and it is not subject to an administrative act. However, member states may require the EEA citizen and family members to register with the relevant authorities. The relevant documentations are:

- an entry visa for non-EEA family members if they are Annex I nationals and do not hold a residence card of a family member of a Union citizen issued by another member state,
- a residence certificate (for EEA citizens) or a residence card (for non-EEA family members), which may be valid for up to 5 years and confirms the right of residence,
- a permanent residence certificate or a permanent residence card, which certifies the right of permanent residence.

Permanent residence is acquired automatically after exercising treaty rights for 5 years, with absences of normally less than 6 months a year, a single absence less than 12 months in certain circumstances (birth, severe sickness, etc.), or longer for military services. (Note: Article 16(3) of the Directive) Permanent residence removes any restrictions that are in place concerning access to public funds (such as unemployment benefits, a state pension etc.), although some of these restrictions are already lifted after a period of 3 months. Permanent residence is only lost after an absence of 2 years.

All applications covered by the directive are free, or require at most a moderate fee similar to comparable national documents.

== Implementation ==
=== Austria ===
In Austria, the directive is transposed into national law mainly via the Niederlassungs- und Aufenthaltsgesetz (regarding residence) and the Fremdenpolizeigesetz (regarding entrance). The applications are handled locally at the Magistrat or Bezirkshauptmannschaft (except in Styria where the Landeshauptmann takes direct responsibility). A credit card sized plastic card (costing about €57 in 2010) is issued to document one's right.

=== Germany ===
In Germany, the directive is transposed into national law via the Freizügigkeitsgesetz/EU, which could be translated as "Freedom of Movement Law/EU". Not all mandatory sections of the Directive are included in the Freizügigkeitsgesetz/EU. The applications are handled locally, together with the mandatory registration of residence.

=== Iceland, Liechtenstein and Norway ===
The EEA countries have had to implement this directive in full. In Norway this was implemented by changing the Alien Law (Norwegian: utlendingsloven), which entered into force on 1 Jan 2010.

=== Italy ===
In Italy the directive has been implemented into Italian legislation with Legislative Decree n. 30 February 6, 2007 The applications are handled by the "Comune" of the city where the applicant takes his or her residence.

=== Ireland ===
In Ireland, the Directive is transposed into the European Communities (Free Movement of Persons) (No. 2) Regulations 2006 amended by SI 310 of 2008 in reaction to the Metock case and amended by SI 146 of 2011 allowing visa free entrance with a residence card issued by another EEA member state.

The non-EEA family members of Irish citizens resident in Ireland are not normally issued EU Family Residency Cards (called Stamp 4 EU FAM) unless the Irish citizen and family members previously lived together in another EU state.

=== The Netherlands ===
Applications are submitted locally at the municipality (gemeente in Dutch) together with the mandatory registration of residence, but they are processed centrally at the Immigration and Naturalisation Service (Immigratie- en Naturalisatiedienst, IND). There is a charge (€53 in 2015) associated with the application.

The family members of Dutch citizens who are and have always been resident in the Netherlands are not permitted to hold EU Family Residency Cards, because EU nationals who have always lived in the country of their nationality are not exercising EU treaty rights and are therefore not considered EU citizens under Dutch law for the purposes of the Directive.

=== Sweden ===
In Sweden the directive has been implemented through changes in several laws, like the Alien Act (SFS 2005:716), and the Aliens Decree (SFS 2006:97). Until 2015 Sweden did not follow the directive fully, as the national identity card was not accepted when a Swedish citizen left Sweden for a non-Schengen EU member state, like the UK. The passport act (SFS 1978:302) required a passport.

=== Switzerland ===
Switzerland is not part of the EU or EEA, but has bilateral agreements with the EU in several fields, including free movement of people. There is an agreement, which contains the same principles as the directive. This includes:

- the right to personal and geographical mobility;
- the right of residence for members of the family and their right to pursue an economic activity, irrespective of their nationality;
- the right to acquire immovable property, specifically in order to establish a main or secondary residence in the host State; and
- the right to return to the host State after the end of an economic activity or period of residence there

for citizens of EU and Switzerland in all these countries.

The freedom of movement between Switzerland and the EFTA countries is afforded by the EFTA convention.

== See also ==
- Free Movement of Workers Regulation 2011
- Freedom of movement for workers
- Internal market
- Ireland's Stamp 4
- UK's European Economic Area Family Permit
- Visa policy in the European Union
- Saenz v. Roe, 526 U.S. 489 (1999)
- Shapiro v. Thompson, 394 U.S. 618 (1969), the Court struck down a durational residency requirement for eligibility for welfare benefits
