= PPP =

PPP or ppp may refer to:

== Arts and entertainment ==
=== Film and television ===
- Pista ng Pelikulang Pilipino, a Philippine film festival
- Potter Puppet Pals, a web series created by Neil Cicierega
- PPPasolini, a 2015 drama based on the life of Pier Paolo Pasolini (1922–1975)
- Purple Pebble Pictures, Indian film production company founded by Priyanka Chopra
- Plan Panni Pannanum, a 2021 Indian Tamil-language film
- Carnival of Monsters, a 1973 Doctor Who serial (production code PPP)

=== Games ===
- Para Para Paradise, a rhythm section video game
- JoJo's Pitter Patter Pop!, a tile matching puzzle video game

=== Music ===
- ppp, a dynamic marking in music for pianississimo
- "PPP" (song), a single from the album Depression Cherry by Beach House released in 2015

=== Other uses in arts and entertainment ===
- Preston is My Paris, a multidisciplinary arts project

== Business, economics, and law ==
- Purchasing power parity, a technique used to determine the relative value of different currencies
- Personal pension scheme (also known as Personal Pension Plan), a type of UK individual pension contract
- Peter Piper Pizza, an American pizza chain
- Public–private partnership, the operation of a service in the partnership of government and the private sector
- Plant Protection Product (pesticide)
- Prepayment penalty, sometimes assessed when a loan is paid off ahead of schedule
- Paycheck Protection Program, a loan program for small businesses in the US introduced during the Covid-19 pandemic
- Polluter pays principle, a principle of environmental law

== People ==
- Parley P. Pratt (1807–1857), an early leader of the Latter Day Saint movement, or his Autobiography, both commonly cited as "PPP"
- Pier Paolo Pasolini (1922–1975), Italian film director and intellectual best known for Salò, or the 120 Days of Sodom

== Politics ==
- Pakistan People's Party
  - Pakistan People's Party (Shaheed Bhutto)
  - Pakistan Peoples Party (Sherpao)
- Palestinian People's Party
- Partido Pilipino sa Pagbabago, Philippines
- People's Party of Panama
- People's Party of Punjab (India)
- People's Pioneer Party, Myanmar
- People's Political Power of Canada
- People's Political Party (Saint Vincent and the Grenadines)
- People Power Party
- People's Power Party (Malaysia)
- People's Power Party (Singapore)
- People's Power Party (Thailand)
- People's Progressive Party (disambiguation), a common name for a political party used in several countries
- Polish Underground State (Polish: Polskie Państwo Podziemne), the Polish Underground State during World War II
- Polska Partia Pracy, literally the "Polish Labour Party"
- Progressive People's Party (disambiguation), a common name for a political party used in several countries
- Public Policy Polling, a polling company
- Puebla-Panama Plan (Spanish: Plan Puebla Panamá), an economic development and integration initiative in Mexico and Central America
- Puwersa ng Pilipinong Pandagat, a political organization in the Philippines
- United Development Party (Indonesian: Partai Persatuan Pembangunan), an Indonesian Islamic political party

== Science and technology ==
=== Medicine ===
- Pearly penile papules, a condition that occurs on male genitalia
- Platelet-poor plasma, blood plasma with very low number of platelets
- Postpartum psychosis, a rare psychiatric condition occurring in the first two weeks after childbirth
- Preputioplasty, a plastic surgical operation on the prepuce or foreskin of the penis
- Purpura pigmentosa progressiva, better known as Schamberg disease
- Pustulosis palmaris et plantaris, a chronic recurrent pustular dermatosis

=== Chemistry ===
- Pariser–Parr–Pople method, an approximation in quantum chemistry
- Pentose phosphate pathway, a chemical process that generates five-carbon sugars
- Phosphorylation, such as 5′-ppp RNA
- Poly(p-phenylene), a conductive polymer

=== Computing ===
- Pay per play, a type of internet advertising using audio ads
- Point-to-Point Protocol, a communications protocol
- PowerPoint presentation, a file created using the Microsoft Office application
- PPP (complexity), a computational complexity class
- Precise Point Positioning, a GNSS data processing technique
- Public, private, protected, class member visibility levels in object-oriented programming
- Pony Preservation Project, a collaborative effort by 4chan's /mlp/ board to build and curate pony datasets with the aim of creating applications in artificial intelligence

== Other uses ==
- Poisson point process, a type of random mathematical object
- Congress-Bundestag Youth Exchange (German: Parlamentarisches Patenschafts-Programm), a German-American exchange scholarship program
- Perfect Prom Project, a charity based in Illinois
- Point Pleasant Park, in Halifax, Nova Scotia
- Programme for People and Planet, a programme of events at Expo 2020, Dubai
- Psychology, Philosophy and Physiology, a degree course at the University of Oxford
- Whitsunday Coast Airport, south of Proserpine, Queensland, Australia, an IATA code
- Pelende language, an ISO 639-3 language code
- The perfect passive participle, a form of verbs in Latin

== See also ==
- Triple P (disambiguation)
- PPE (disambiguation)
