= PPE =

PPE or ppe may refer to:

== Science and technology ==
=== Computing ===
- Power Processing Element, a PowerPC implementation
- PCBoard Program Executable, for the PCBoard BBS

=== Chemicals ===
- Polyphenyl ether, a class of polymer
- Poly(p-phenylene oxide), a high-temperature thermoplastic

=== Medicine ===
- Palmoplantar erythema, a chemotherapy side effect
- Pruritic papular eruption of HIV disease
- Preparticipation physical evaluation, of an athlete

=== Vehicular ===
- Power and Propulsion Element, a NASA spacecraft module
- Premium Platform Electric, a modular car platform

=== Other uses in science and technology ===
- Personal protective equipment, worn to ameliorate hazards
- Perturbed physics ensemble (and perturbed parameter ensemble), climate models

== Other uses ==
- Philosophy, politics and economics, in academia
- Property, plant and equipment, in accounting
- Permitted paid engagement, in the visa policy of the United Kingdom
- Mar de Cortés International Airport, Mexico (IATA:PPE)
- Papi language, spoken in Papua New Guinea (ISO 639-3:ppe)

== See also ==
- European People's Party (EPP, French PPE)
  - European People's Party group (EPP Group)
