= Visa policies of British Overseas Territories =

Policies on permits required to enter the British Overseas Territories

The British Overseas Territories maintain their own entry requirements different from the visa policy of the United Kingdom. As a general rule, British citizens do not have automatic right of abode in these territories.

== Akrotiri and Dhekelia ==
Visa policy of the Schengen Area, which applies to Akrotiri and Dhekelia

The visa policy of Akrotiri and Dhekelia is the same as for Cyprus, which follows the visa policy of the Schengen Area. However, stays longer than 28 days per 12-month period require a permit. The territory has open borders with Cyprus, but controls entry from Northern Cyprus.

== Anguilla ==
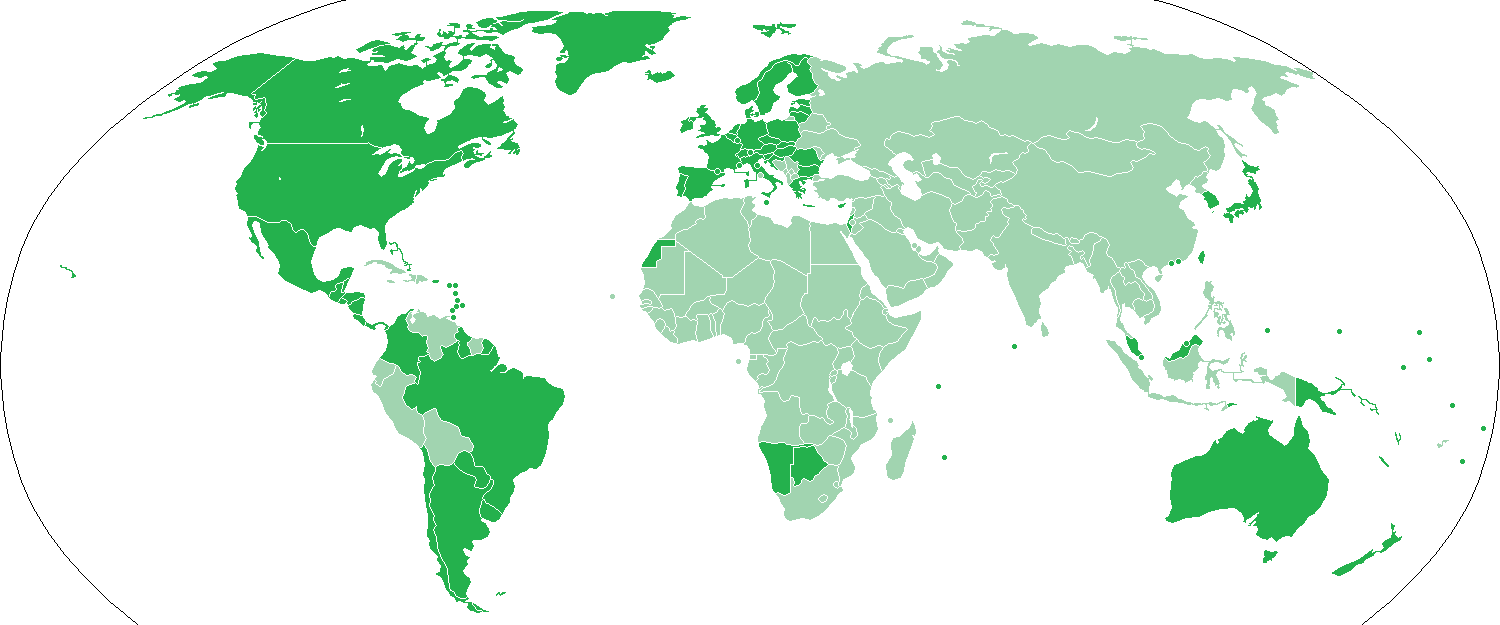
Visa policy of Anguilla

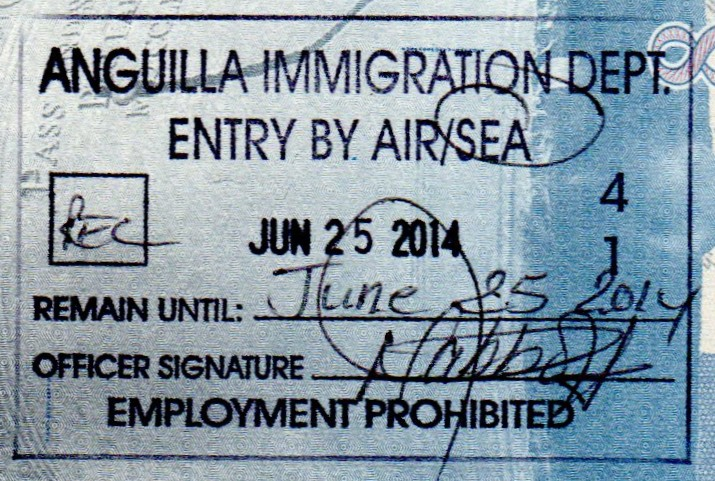
Anguilla entry stamp

Anguilla – A maximum visa-free stay of 3 months is granted to nationals of all European Union countries, Andorra, Antigua and Barbuda, Argentina, Australia, Bahamas, Barbados, Belize, Botswana, Brazil, Brunei, Canada, Chile, Colombia, Costa Rica, Dominica, East Timor, El Salvador, Grenada, Guatemala, Guyana, Honduras, Hong Kong, Iceland, Israel, Japan, Kiribati, Liechtenstein, Macao, (Note: As of 2026, the Anguilla e-visa website lists Macao and Taiwan as visa-required nationalities, but the list of visa requirements published by the government of Anguilla and Timatic mention holders of Macao passports and of Taiwan passports with an identification card number as visa-exempt.) Malaysia, Maldives, Marshall Islands, Mauritius, Mexico, Micronesia, Monaco, Namibia, Nauru, New Zealand, Nicaragua, Norway, Palau, Panama, Papua New Guinea, Paraguay, Saint Kitts and Nevis, Saint Lucia, Saint Vincent and the Grenadines, Samoa, San Marino, Seychelles, Singapore, Solomon Islands, South Korea, Switzerland, Taiwan, Tonga, Trinidad and Tobago, Tuvalu, United Kingdom, United States, Uruguay, Vanuatu and Western Sahara.

In addition, holders of a valid visa or residence permit for the United Kingdom, United States or Canada do not need a visa for Anguilla.

From January 2021, other travellers may apply online for an electronic visa.

Statistics

Most visitors arriving in Anguilla were from the following countries:

Country	2016	2015
United States	101,055	105,189
Canada	10,498	12,173
United Kingdom	5,021	6,272
Italy	2,656	2,402
Germany	1,623	1,880
Total	175,970	186,068

== Bermuda ==
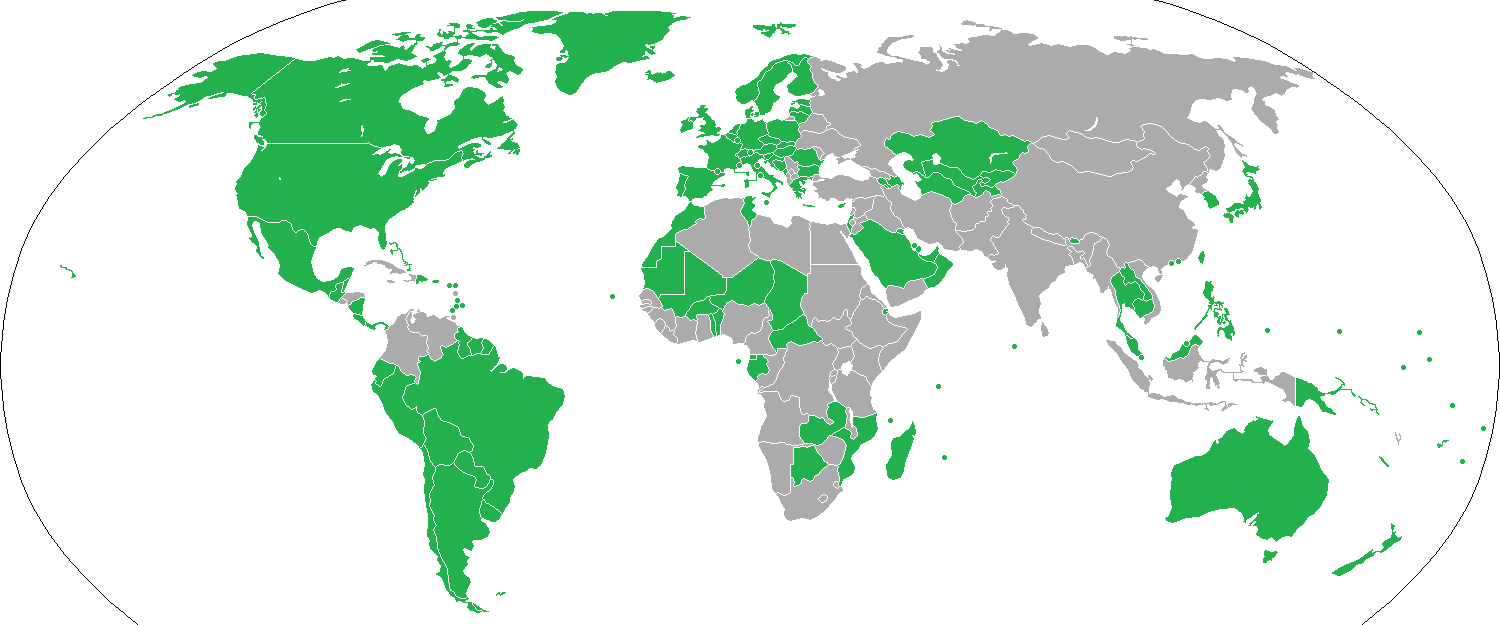
Visa policy of Bermuda

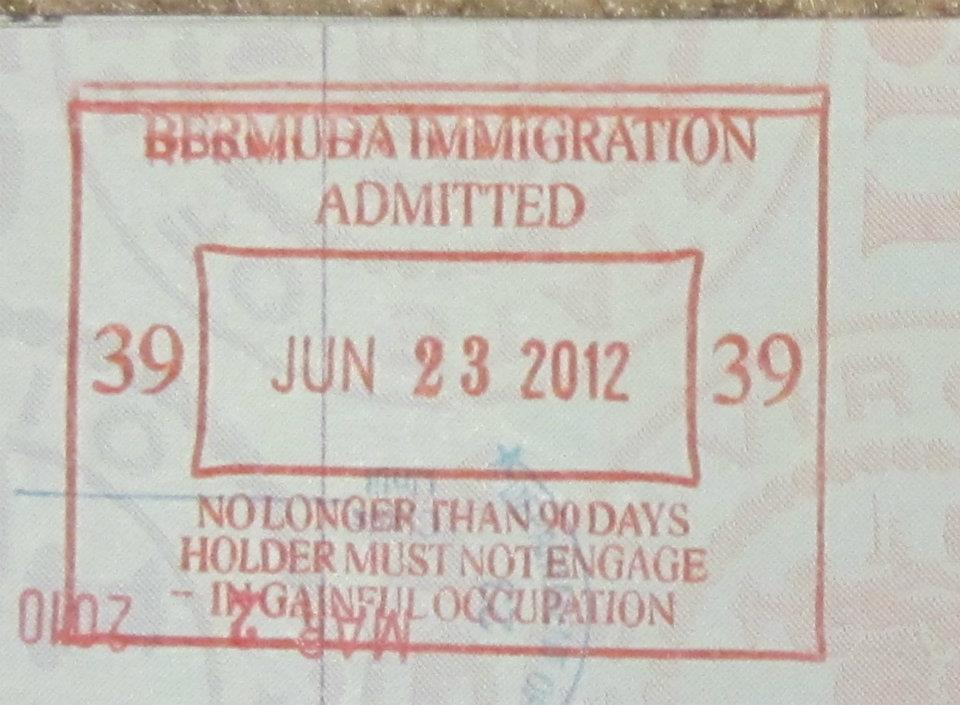
Bermuda passport stamp

Bermuda – Follows mainly the visa policy of the United Kingdom. A visa-free stay is granted to nationals of all European Union countries, Andorra, Antigua and Barbuda, Argentina, Armenia, Australia, Azerbaijan, Bahamas, Bahrain, Barbados, Belize, Benin, Bhutan, Bolivia, Bosnia and Herzegovina, Botswana, Brazil, Brunei, Burkina Faso, Cambodia, Canada, Cape Verde, Central African Republic, Chad, Chile, Comoros, Costa Rica, Djibouti, Dominican Republic, Ecuador, Equatorial Guinea, Fiji, Gabon, Grenada, Guatemala, Guyana, Hong Kong, Iceland, Israel, Japan, Kazakhstan, Kiribati, Kuwait, Kyrgyzstan, Laos, Liechtenstein, Macao, Madagascar, Malaysia, Maldives, Mali, Marshall Islands, Mauritania, Mauritius, Mexico, Micronesia, Monaco, Montenegro, Morocco, Mozambique, Nauru, New Zealand, Nicaragua, Niger, Norway, Oman, Palau, Panama, Papua New Guinea, Paraguay, Peru, Philippines, Qatar, Saint Kitts and Nevis, Saint Lucia, Saint Vincent and the Grenadines, Samoa, San Marino, São Tomé and Príncipe, Saudi Arabia, Seychelles, Singapore, Solomon Islands, South Korea, Suriname, Switzerland, Taiwan, (Note: Holding a passport that includes the number of the identification card.) Tajikistan, Thailand, Togo, Tonga, Tunisia, Turkmenistan, Tuvalu, United Arab Emirates, United Kingdom, United States, Uruguay, Uzbekistan, Vatican City, Zambia, and nationals of Cuba, Haiti, Ukraine and Venezuela with a work permit.

Nationals of other countries must present a visa or travel authorisation for Canada, the United Kingdom or the United States (the countries with frequent flights from Bermuda), valid for at least 45 days from their intended departure from Bermuda, or a government letter attesting that they are a spouse of a Bermudian or belong to Bermuda. Since 1 March 2014, Bermuda does not issue its own visas.

Visitors are granted entry for a stay of up to 180 days in any 12-month period.

Statistics

Most visitors arriving in Bermuda (including arrivals by air, cruise and yacht) were from the following countries:

Country	2017	2016	2015
United States	551,976	525,292	484,333
Canada	47,852	43,474	43,931
United Kingdom	41,348	35,487	32,796
Europe	26,869	23,054	20,759
Total	692,947	646,465	597,261

== British Antarctic Territory ==
British Antarctic Territory – The territory is administered in London by staff in the Polar Regions Department of the Foreign and Commonwealth Office which issues permits to those travelling to the territory. New applications should be filed at least 4 months in advance. Organisers need to demonstrate that they are sufficiently prepared for a visit to Antarctica.

== British Indian Ocean Territory ==
British Indian Ocean Territory – Visitors must obtain a valid permit before travelling. Permits are issued by British Indian Ocean Territory Administration at the Foreign and Commonwealth Office in London. Any permit issued is valid for the outer islands only while the access to Diego Garcia is restricted to those with connections to the military facility. No unauthorised vessel is permitted to approach the Diego Garcia within 3 nautical miles and vessels in transit, on innocent passage as defined under maritime law, should maintain their course away from Diego Garcia. Proof of travel insurance and yacht insurance is required. Passports must be valid for 6 months. Any person who enters BIOT without a permit is liable to imprisonment for 3 years and/or a fine of £3000.

== British Virgin Islands ==
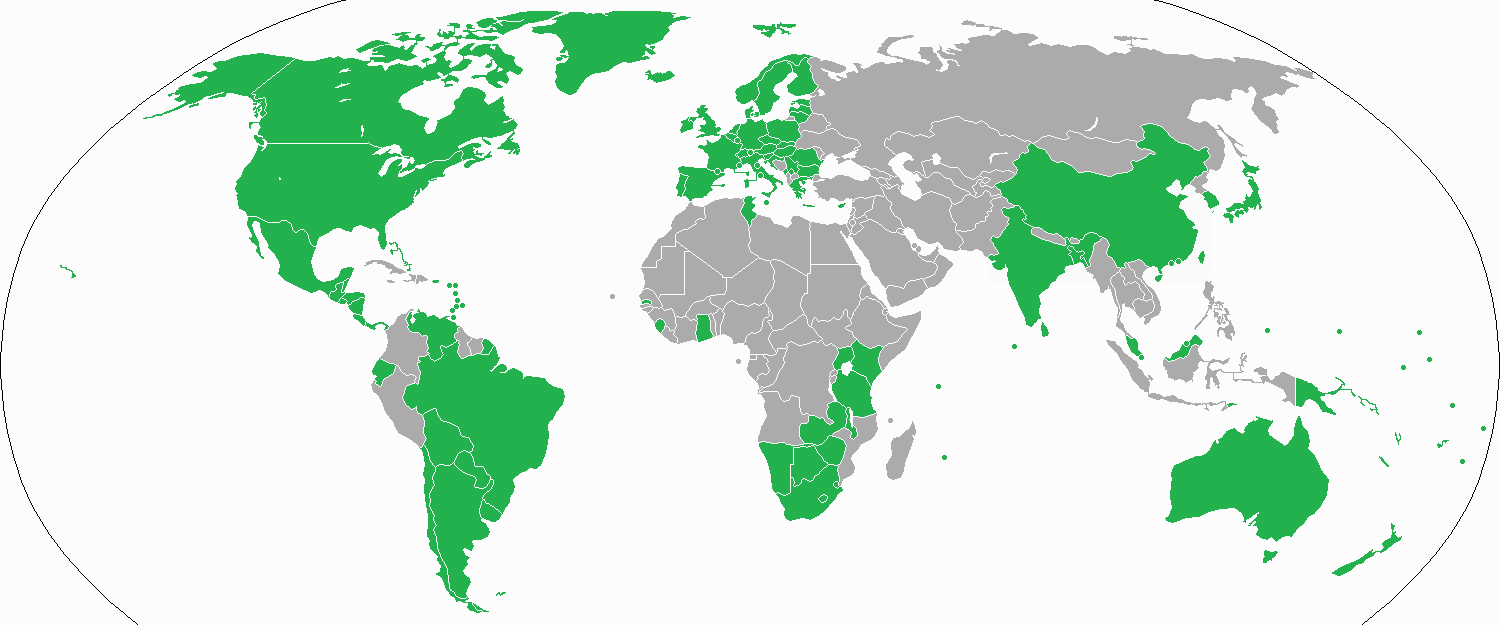
Visa policy of the British Virgin Islands

British Virgin Islands – Visitors are usually granted a one-month entry stamp on arrival, and may request an extension of stay up to 6 months.

A visa-free stay is granted to nationals of all European Union countries, Andorra, Antigua and Barbuda, Argentina, Australia, Bahamas, Bangladesh, Barbados, Belize, Bolivia, Botswana, Brazil, Brunei, Canada, Chile, China, Costa Rica, Dominica, East Timor, Ecuador, El Salvador, Eswatini, Fiji, Gambia, Ghana, Grenada, Guatemala, Honduras, Hong Kong, (Note: China (including Hong Kong), Kosovo, Montenegro, Serbia and South Sudan were not listed as visa-required nationalities by the government of the British Virgin Islands in 2023, but as of 2026, Timatic lists a visa requirement for nationals of these countries except China with mainland and Macao passports.) Iceland, India, Japan, Kenya, Kiribati, Kosovo, Lesotho, Liechtenstein, Macao, Malawi, Malaysia, Maldives, Marshall Islands, Mauritius, Mexico, Micronesia, Monaco, Montenegro, Namibia, Nauru, New Zealand, Nicaragua, Norway, Palau, Panama, Papua New Guinea, Paraguay, Saint Kitts and Nevis, Saint Lucia, Saint Vincent and the Grenadines, Samoa, San Marino, Serbia, Seychelles, Sierra Leone, Singapore, Solomon Islands, South Africa, South Korea, Sri Lanka, Switzerland, Taiwan, Tanzania, Tonga, Trinidad and Tobago, Tunisia, Tuvalu, Uganda, United Kingdom, United States, Uruguay, Vanuatu, Vatican City, Venezuela, Zambia and Zimbabwe.

In addition, holders of a visa for the United Kingdom, United States or Canada do not need a visa for the British Virgin Islands. The visa for those countries must have at least 6 months of validity before travel to the territory.

Cruise ship passengers do not need a visa for stays of up to 24 hours. Nationals of Belarus, Moldova, Russia and Ukraine visiting by mega yacht, without sanctions, do not need a visa for stays of up to two weeks.

== Cayman Islands ==
Visa policy of the Cayman Islands

Cayman Islands – A maximum visa-free stay of 6 months, for tourist purposes only, is granted to nationals of all European Union countries, Andorra, Antigua and Barbuda, Argentina, Australia, Bahamas, Bahrain, Barbados, Belize, Botswana, Brazil, Brunei, Canada, Chile, Costa Rica, Dominica, Ecuador, Eswatini, Fiji, Grenada, Guyana, Hong Kong, Iceland, Israel, Japan, Kenya, Kiribati, Kuwait, Lesotho, Liechtenstein, Malawi, Malaysia, Maldives, Mauritius, Mexico, Monaco, Mozambique, Namibia, Nauru, New Zealand, Norway, Oman, Panama, Papua New Guinea, Saint Kitts and Nevis, Saint Lucia, Saint Vincent and the Grenadines, Samoa, San Marino, Seychelles, Singapore, Solomon Islands, South Africa, Switzerland, Taiwan, Tanzania, Tonga, Trinidad and Tobago, Tuvalu, United Kingdom, United States, Vanuatu and Zambia; and nationals of Jamaica under 15 or over 70 years of age. (Note: The regulations of 2025 specified a visa waiver for nationals of all countries in the Commonwealth of Nations except for Bangladesh, Cameroon, Gambia, Ghana, India, Jamaica (between 15 and 70 years of age), Nigeria, Pakistan, Sierra Leone, Sri Lanka and Uganda. Rwanda joined the Commonwealth of Nations in 2009, and Gabon and Togo joined in 2022, but as of 2026 the government of the Cayman Islands and Timatic still listed a visa requirement for nationals of these countries.)

A maximum visa-free stay of 30 days is also granted to permanent residents of the United States when arriving directly from the United States, of Canada when arriving directly from Canada or the United States, or of the United Kingdom when arriving directly from the United Kingdom.

Nationals of China, India and Jamaica who hold a valid visa issued by the United States, Canada or the United Kingdom can visit the Cayman Islands for up to 30 days only if arriving directly from the country that issued the visa.

Passengers can transit without a visa except for nationals of Afghanistan, Albania, Algeria, Angola, Bangladesh, Belarus, Burundi, Cameroon, China, Colombia, Congo, Cuba, Democratic Republic of the Congo, Dominican Republic, Eritrea, Ethiopia, Gambia, Ghana, Haiti, India, Iran, Iraq, Ivory Coast, Lebanon, Liberia, Moldova, Montenegro, Myanmar, Nepal, Nigeria, North Macedonia, Northern Cyprus, Pakistan, Palestine, Peru, Rwanda, Saudi Arabia, Senegal, Serbia, Sierra Leone, Somalia, Sri Lanka, Sudan, Syria, Turkey, Uganda, Venezuela, Vietnam and Zimbabwe.

Date of visa exemption
- 26 September 2014: Costa Rica and Croatia
- 29 March 2017: removed Bulgaria and Romania
- 24 October 2018: resumed Bulgaria and Romania
- 2 April 2026: removed Peru and Venezuela

Statistics

Most visitors arriving in the Cayman Islands by air were from the following countries:

Country	2017	2016	2015
United States	340,955	300,571	291,759
Canada	24,757	23,274	24,299
United Kingdom	14,017	14,919	14,718
Jamaica	9,393	9,167	8,484
Honduras	3,099	2,666	1,682
Italy	1,492	1,924	1,935
Germany	1,426	1,641	1,745
Cuba	1,363	7,230	12,684
Australia	1,303	1,653	1,772
Ireland	1,242	1,221	1,320
Bahamas	1,225	1,070	793
Brazil	1,194	743	941
Total	418,403	385,451	385,378

== Falkland Islands ==
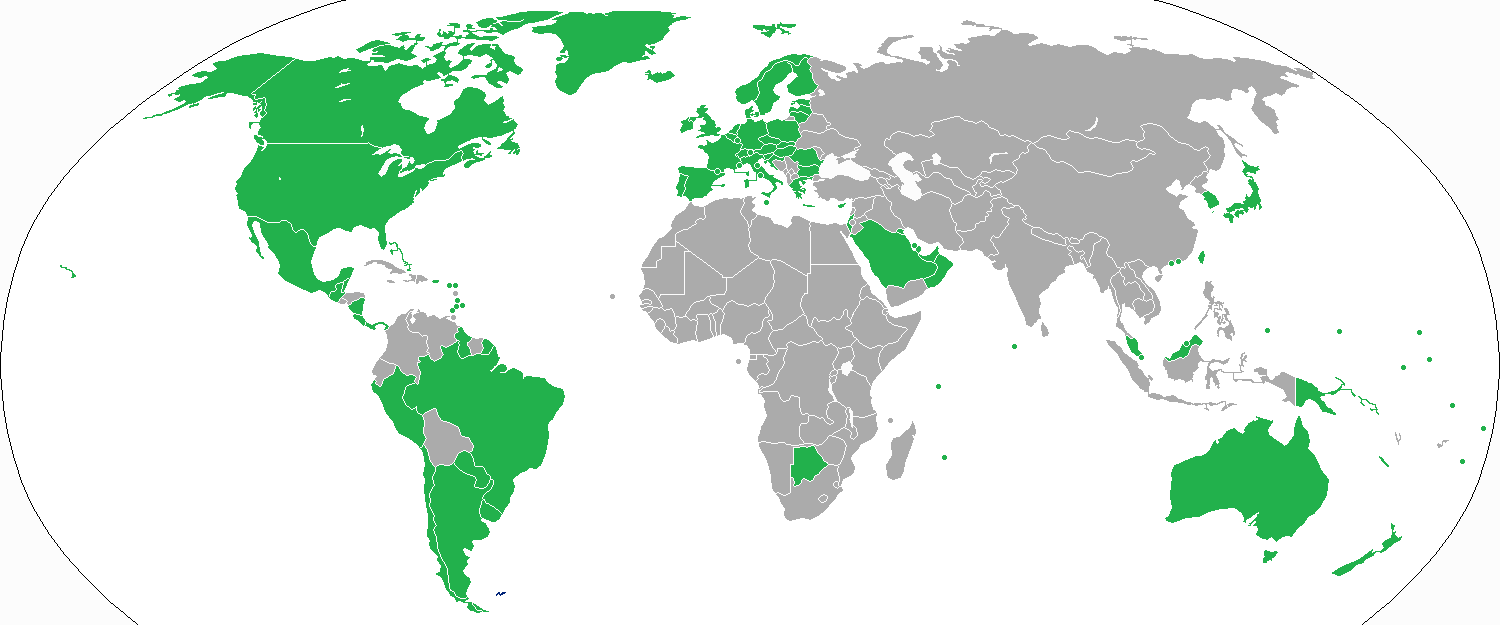
Visa policy of the Falkland Islands

Falkland Islands – Follows mainly the visa policy of the United Kingdom. The Customs and Immigration Department of the Falkland Islands controls entry into the territory.

=== Visa exemption ===
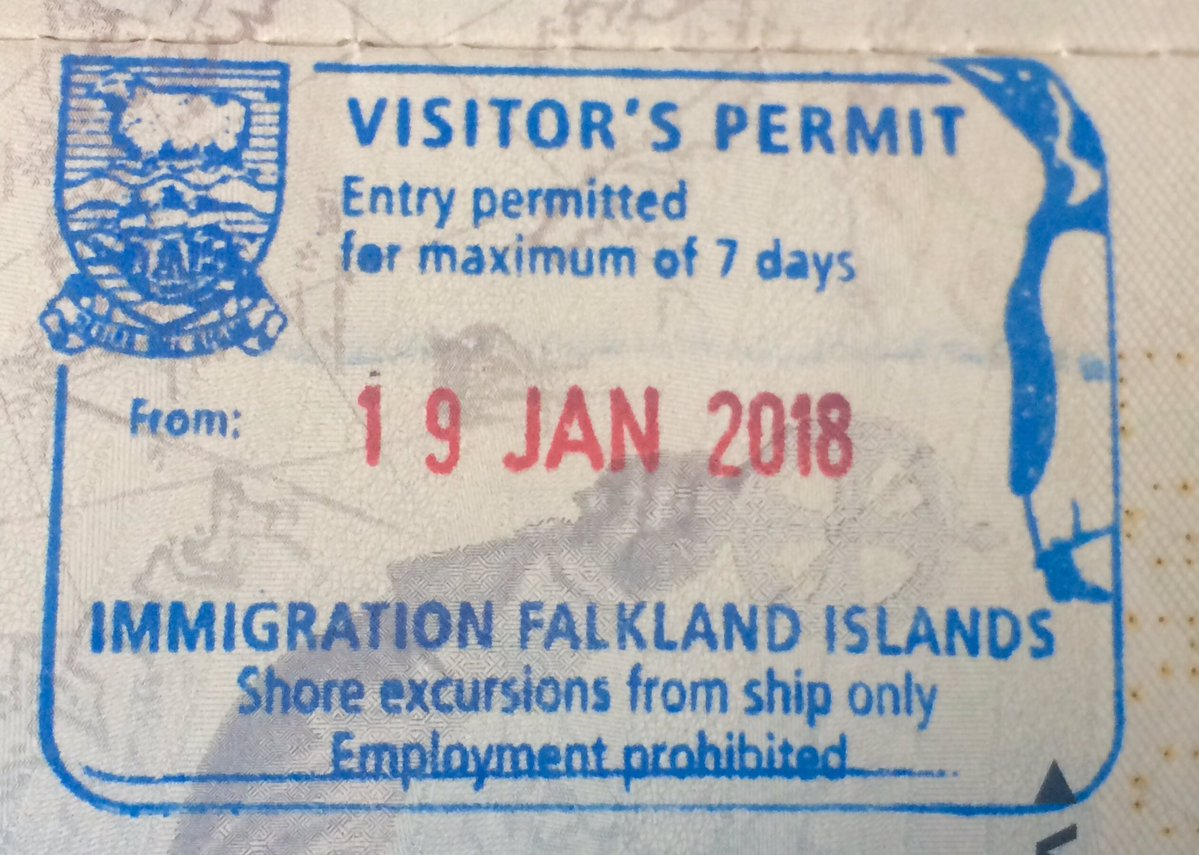
A visitor's permit valid for seven days for shore excursions only, issued to any visitor regardless of nationality.

Cruise ship visitors regardless of nationality do not need a visa to enter the Falkland Islands or to participate in shore excursions for up to seven days. However, visitors arriving by air or intending to spend time in the Falkland Islands before or after a cruise need a visa if not otherwise exempt.

Land-base visitors are required to have evidence of accommodation and funds for the duration of their stay, a return ticket, and travel insurance including medical evacuation should it be required.

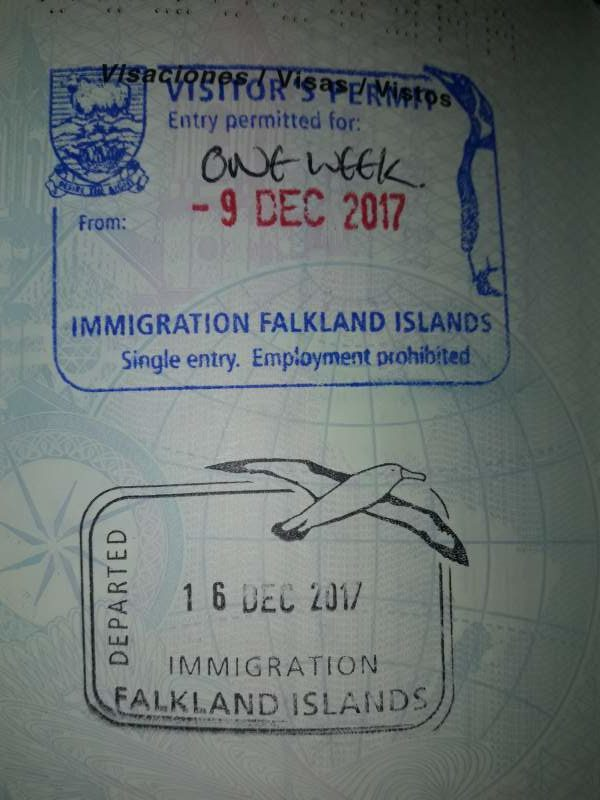
Single entry visitor's permit and departure stamp in an Argentine passport.

Nationals of the following countries and territories holding a valid passport can enter the Falkland Islands without a visa for a period of one month and are issued a visitor's permit on arrival:

- European Union member states
- Andorra
- Antigua and Barbuda
- Argentina
- Australia
- Bahamas
- Bahrain
- Barbados
- Belize
- Botswana
- Brazil
- Brunei
- Canada
- Chile
- Costa Rica
- Grenada
- Guatemala
- Guyana
- Hong Kong
- Iceland
- Israel
- Japan
- Kiribati
- Kuwait
- Liechtenstein
- Macao
- Malaysia
- Maldives
- Marshall Islands
- Mauritius
- Mexico
- Micronesia
- Monaco
- Nauru
- New Zealand
- Nicaragua
- Norway
- Oman
- Palau
- Panama
- Papua New Guinea
- Paraguay
- Peru
- Qatar
- Saint Kitts and Nevis
- Saint Lucia
- Saint Vincent and the Grenadines
- Samoa
- San Marino
- Saudi Arabia
- Seychelles
- Singapore
- Solomon Islands
- South Korea
- Switzerland
- Taiwan
- Tonga
- Tuvalu
- United Arab Emirates
- United Kingdom
- United States
- Uruguay
- Vatican City

In addition, holders of a United Nations laissez-passer do not need a visa. All visa-exempt visitors may extend their visit up to a maximum of 12 months by applying directly to Customs and Immigration in Stanley.

Date of visa exemption
- before 1 January 2000: Andorra, Argentina, Australia, Austria, Belgium, Brazil, Canada, Chile, Cyprus, Denmark, Finland, France, Germany, Greece, Hong Kong, Iceland, Ireland, Israel, Italy, Japan, Liechtenstein, Luxembourg, Malta, Netherlands, New Zealand, Norway, Portugal, San Marino, South Africa, South Korea, Spain, Sweden, Switzerland, United Kingdom, United States, Uruguay, Vatican City
- 1 May 2004: Czech Republic, Estonia, Hungary, Latvia, Lithuania, Poland, Slovakia, Slovenia
- 1 January 2007: Bulgaria, Romania
- 30 November 2010: Taiwan
- 1 July 2013: Croatia
- 27 October 2025: Antigua and Barbuda, Bahamas, Bahrain, Barbados, Belize, Botswana, Brunei, Costa Rica, Grenada, Guatemala, Guyana, Kiribati, Kuwait, Macao, Malaysia, Maldives, Marshall Islands, Mauritius, Mexico, Micronesia, Monaco, Nauru, Nicaragua, Oman, Palau, Panama, Papua New Guinea, Paraguay, Peru, Qatar, Saint Kitts and Nevis, Saint Lucia, Saint Vincent and the Grenadines, Samoa, Saudi Arabia, Seychelles, Singapore, Solomon Islands, Tonga, Tuvalu, United Arab Emirates; removed South Africa

=== Visa types ===
- Visitor permit: Nationals of countries not listed as visa-exempt need to obtain a visitor permit prior to arrival in the Falklands.
- Work permit: A work permit must be applied from outside of the Falkland Islands initially. It grants permission for the holder to enter, depart and reside in the Falklands during the period of its validity, and to take employment with a specified employer or on one's own account engage in any trade, business or vocation stated in the permit. Maximum validity is 2 years but it can be renewed on application.
- Temporary residence permit: A residence permit, which needs to be applied from outside of the Falkland Islands, grants permission for the holder to enter, depart and reside in the Falklands during the period of its validity up to a maximum of 3 years, but it can be renewed on application. The holder of a residence permit and any dependents included in the permit are entitled to apply for work permits if they wish to subsequently take up an employment opportunity.
- Permanent residence permit: A permanent residence permit grants indefinite leave for the holder to enter, depart and reside in the Falkland Islands and to take any lawful employment or pursue any lawful business, trade, profession, or vocation in the Falkland Islands without needing a work permit. Where an application for a permanent residence permit is approved, any dependents included in the application of a principal applicant are also granted a permanent residence permit in their own right. The annual number of permanent residence permits that may be granted is controlled by a quota system.

=== Transit ===
All travellers who would normally require a visa to enter the Falkland Islands but are transiting by air or sea for less than 24 hours are exempted from the visa requirement.

== Gibraltar ==
Visa policy of the Schengen Area, which applies to Gibraltar

Gibraltar – Follows the visa policy of the Schengen Area. The territory has open borders with Spain.

== Montserrat ==
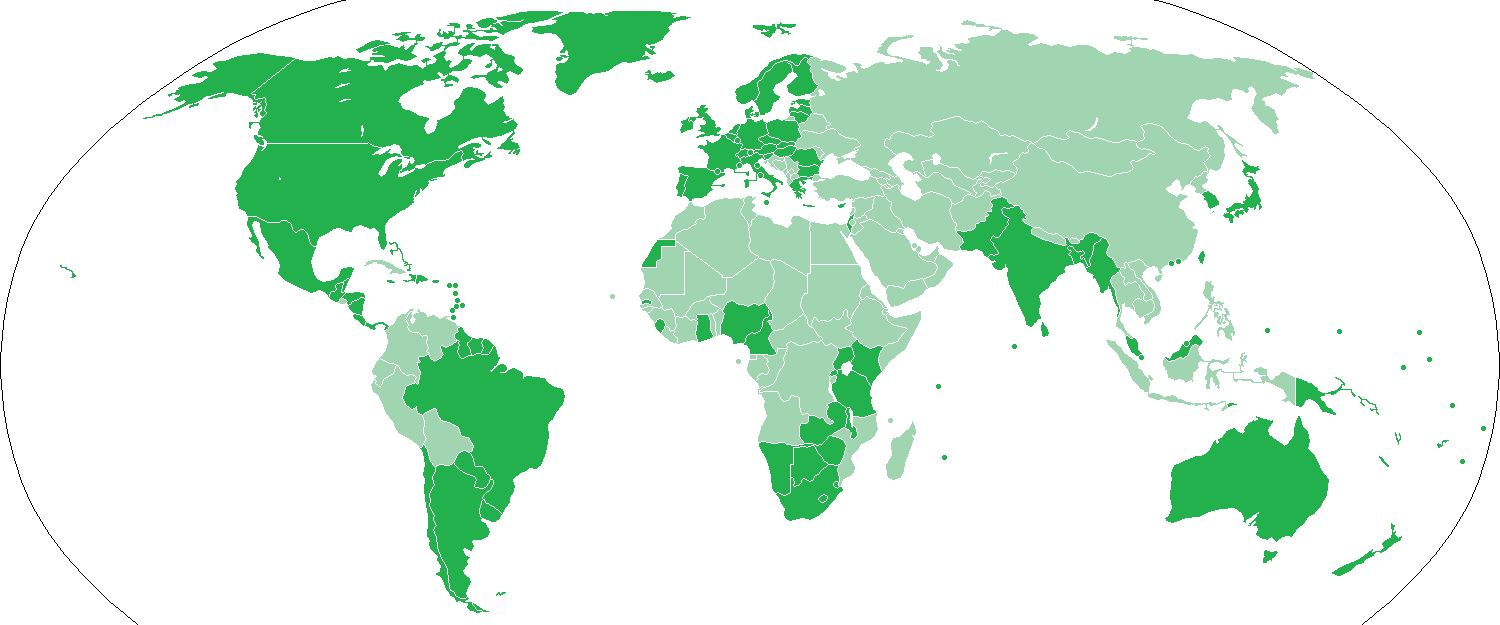
Visa policy of Montserrat

Montserrat – A visa-free stay of 6 months is granted to nationals of all European Union countries (except Croatia), Andorra, Antigua and Barbuda, Argentina, Australia, Bahamas, Bangladesh, Barbados, Belize, Botswana, Brazil, Brunei, Cameroon, Canada, Chile, Costa Rica, Dominica, Dominican Republic, East Timor, Eswatini, Fiji, Gambia, Ghana, Grenada, Guatemala, Guyana, Haiti, Honduras, Hong Kong, Iceland, India, Israel, Jamaica, Japan, Kenya, Kiribati, Lesotho, Liechtenstein, Macao, Malawi, Malaysia, Maldives, Marshall Islands, Mauritius, Mexico, Micronesia, Monaco, Myanmar, Namibia, Nauru, New Zealand, Nicaragua, Nigeria, Norway, Pakistan, Palau, Panama, Papua New Guinea, Paraguay, Rwanda, Saint Kitts and Nevis, Saint Lucia, Saint Vincent and the Grenadines, Samoa, San Marino, Seychelles, Sierra Leone, Singapore, Solomon Islands, South Africa, South Korea, Sri Lanka, Suriname, Switzerland, Taiwan, Tanzania, Tonga, Trinidad and Tobago, Tuvalu, Uganda, United Kingdom, United States, Uruguay, Vanuatu, Vatican City, Western Sahara, Zambia and Zimbabwe.

In addition, holders of a valid visa for the United Kingdom, United States, Canada or an EU country do not need a visa for Montserrat.

Other travellers may apply online for an electronic visa, which is valid for 1 year and may be used for multiple entries.

== Pitcairn Islands ==
Pitcairn Islands – Visitors intending to stay for up to 14 days do not need a visa or prior clearance, and may obtain permission to enter on arrival. Visits longer than 14 days or for employment or business purposes require an entry clearance, whose application should be submitted electronically at least 3 months before travel.

== Saint Helena, Ascension and Tristan da Cunha ==
Different rules apply to each part of the territory of Saint Helena, Ascension and Tristan da Cunha:

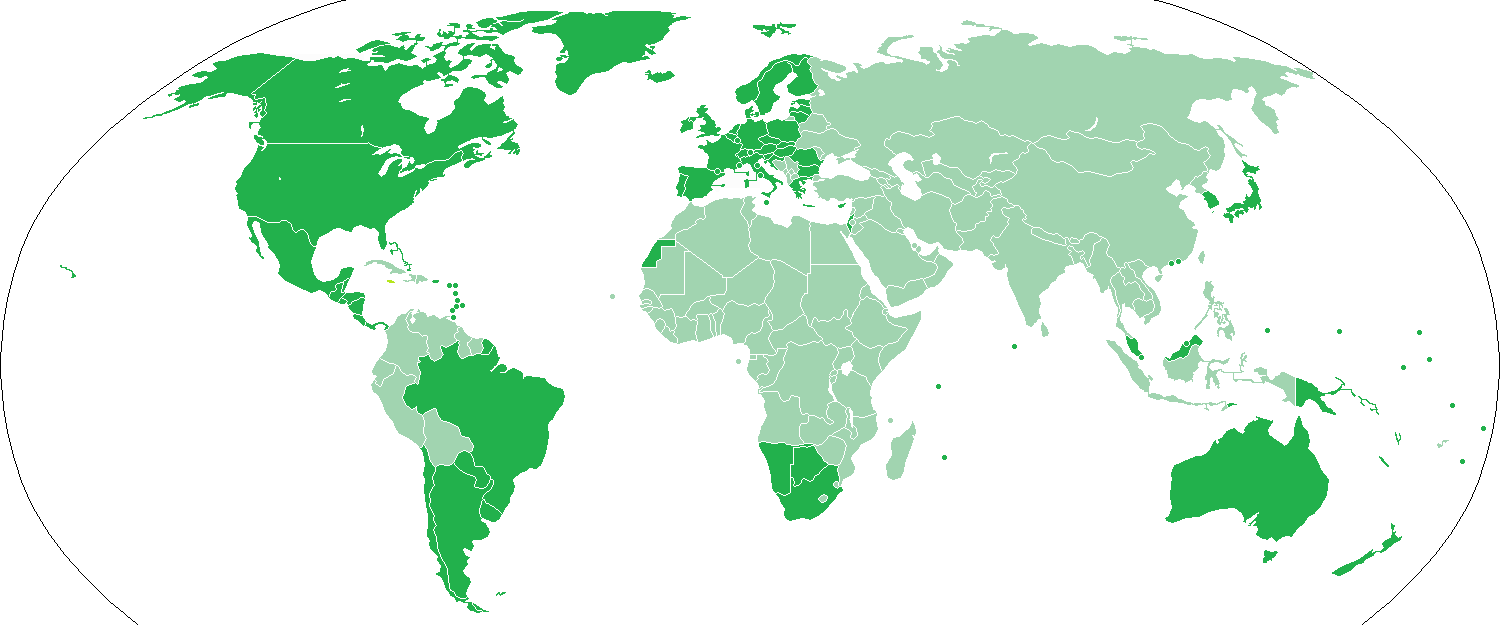
Visa policy of Saint Helena

Saint Helena – Visa-free entry is granted to nationals of all European Union countries, Andorra, Antigua and Barbuda, Argentina, Australia, Bahamas, Barbados, Belize, Botswana, Brazil, Brunei, Canada, Chile, Costa Rica, Dominica, East Timor, El Salvador, Grenada, Guatemala, Honduras, Hong Kong, Iceland, Israel, Japan, Kiribati, Liechtenstein, Macao, Malaysia, Maldives, Marshall Islands, Mauritius, Mexico, Micronesia, Monaco, Namibia, Nauru, New Zealand, Nicaragua, Norway, Palau, Panama, Papua New Guinea, Paraguay, Saint Kitts and Nevis, Saint Lucia, Saint Vincent and the Grenadines, Samoa, San Marino, Seychelles, Singapore, Solomon Islands, South Africa, South Korea, Switzerland, Tonga, Trinidad and Tobago, Tuvalu, United Kingdom, United States, Uruguay, Vanuatu, Vatican City and Western Sahara.
Nationals of other countries may apply online for an electronic visa.

Ascension Island – Visitors of all nationalities, including British citizens, need a visa for Ascension Island, except certain government and military personnel, their dependents, and crew members. The Ascension Island government introduced an electronic visa (e-visa) system in the first half of 2018. There are seven e-visa categories: tourist, business, scientific/research, transit, contractor, employment and dependents/family. Tourist e-visas allow a single stay of up to 3 months and are not issued for more than a cumulative duration of 3 months in any 12-month period.
From May 2015, the Ascension Island government does not issue visas to nationals of Belarus, China, Egypt, Iran, Libya, North Korea, Russia, Syria, Ukraine and Vietnam, and from 2017, to passport holders of Hong Kong, Macao and Taiwan.

Tristan da Cunha – All visitors must request permission to land in advance from the Secretary of the Administrator. They must also have a return passage, health insurance including medical evacuation, and sufficient funds for their visit.

== South Georgia and the South Sandwich Islands ==
South Georgia and the South Sandwich Islands – The Commissioner of South Georgia and the South Sandwich Islands, based in Stanley, regulates all access to the territory. All visitors irrespective of their nationality or mode of transport must apply to the Commissioner for permission to land in advance. The visit permit is issued to a 'permit holder', normally a cruise vessel expedition leader or a yacht master. Visitors travelling as paying passengers on cruise ships and yachts do not need to submit a visit application.

== Turks and Caicos Islands ==
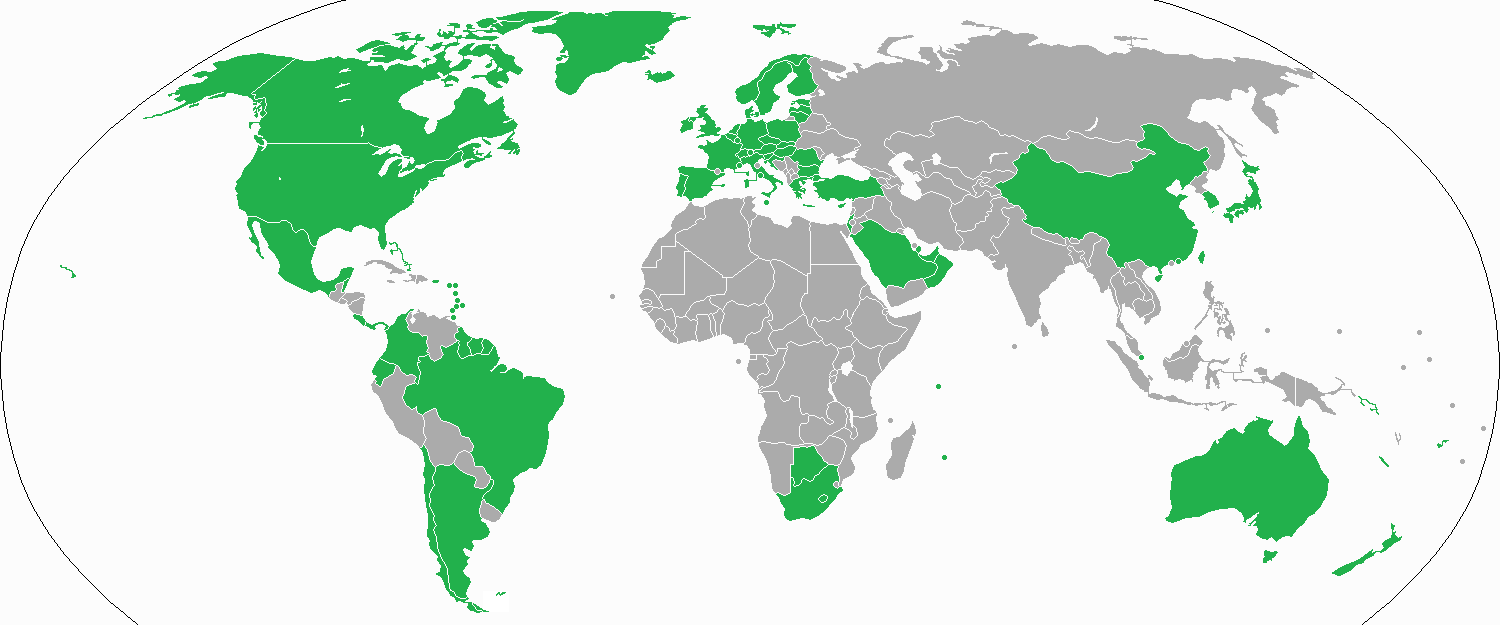
Visa policy of the Turks and Caicos Islands

Turks and Caicos Islands – A visa-free stay of 90 days is granted to nationals of all European Union countries, Antigua and Barbuda, Argentina, Australia, Bahamas, Barbados, Belize, Botswana, Brazil, Canada, Chile, China, Colombia, Costa Rica, Dominica, Ecuador, Fiji, Grenada, Guyana, Hong Kong, Iceland, Israel, Japan, Lesotho, Liechtenstein, Mauritius, Mexico, Monaco, New Zealand, Norway, Oman, Panama, Qatar, Saint Kitts and Nevis, Saint Lucia, Saint Vincent and the Grenadines, Saudi Arabia, Seychelles, Singapore, Solomon Islands, South Africa, South Korea, Suriname, Switzerland, Taiwan, Trinidad and Tobago, Turkey, United Arab Emirates, United Kingdom, United States and Vatican City.

In addition, holders of a valid visa or residence permit for the United Kingdom, United States or Canada do not need a visa for the Turks and Caicos Islands.

== Summary of visa exemptions ==
Country or territory	United Kingdom and Crown dependencies	Gibraltar and Akrotiri and Dhekelia	Bermuda	Turks and Caicos Islands (Note: Holders of a valid visa or residence permit for the United Kingdom, United States or Canada do not need a visa.)	Cayman Islands	British Virgin Islands (Note: Holders of a visa for the United Kingdom, United States or Canada do not need a visa. The visa for those countries must have at least 6 months of validity before travel.)	Anguilla	Montserrat (Note: Holders of a valid visa for the United Kingdom, United States, Canada or an EU country do not need a visa.)	Saint Helena (Note: Does not include Ascension Island and Tristan da Cunha, which require a visa or prior permission for all visitors.)	Falkland Islands (Note: Cruise ship visitors do not need a visa to enter the Falkland Islands or to participate in shore excursions for up to seven days during the cruise.)	Pitcairn Islands
United Kingdom	Yes	Yes	Yes	Yes	Yes	Yes	Yes	Yes	Yes	Yes	Yes
Ireland	Yes	Yes	Yes	Yes	Yes	Yes	Yes	Yes	Yes	Yes	Yes
EU single market (except Croatia and Ireland)	ETA	Yes	Yes	Yes	Yes	Yes	Yes	Yes	Yes	Yes	Yes
Croatia	ETA	Yes	Yes	Yes	Yes	Yes	Yes	eVisa	Yes	Yes	Yes
Andorra	ETA	Yes	Yes	No	Yes	Yes	Yes	Yes	Yes	Yes	Yes
Antigua and Barbuda	ETA	Yes	Yes	Yes	Yes	Yes	Yes	Yes	Yes	Yes	Yes
Argentina	ETA	Yes	Yes	Yes	Yes	Yes	Yes	Yes	Yes	Yes	Yes
Australia	ETA	Yes	Yes	Yes	Yes	Yes	Yes	Yes	Yes	Yes	Yes
Bahamas	ETA	Yes	Yes	Yes	Yes	Yes	Yes	Yes	Yes	Yes	Yes
Bahrain	ETA	No	Yes	No	Yes	No	eVisa	eVisa	eVisa	Yes	Yes
Barbados	ETA	Yes	Yes	Yes	Yes	Yes	Yes	Yes	Yes	Yes	Yes
Belize	ETA	No	Yes	Yes	Yes	Yes	Yes	Yes	Yes	Yes	Yes
Brazil	ETA	Yes	Yes	Yes	Yes	Yes	Yes	Yes	Yes	Yes	Yes
Brunei	ETA	Yes	Yes	No	Yes	Yes	Yes	Yes	Yes	Yes	Yes
Canada	ETA	Yes	Yes	Yes	Yes	Yes	Yes	Yes	Yes	Yes	Yes
Chile	ETA	Yes	Yes	Yes	Yes	Yes	Yes	Yes	Yes	Yes	Yes
Costa Rica	ETA	Yes	Yes	Yes	Yes	Yes	Yes	Yes	Yes	Yes	Yes
Grenada	ETA	Yes	Yes	Yes	Yes	Yes	Yes	Yes	Yes	Yes	Yes
Guatemala	ETA	Yes	Yes	No	No	Yes	Yes	Yes	Yes	Yes	Yes
Guyana	ETA	No	Yes	Yes	Yes	No	Yes	Yes	eVisa	Yes	Yes
Hong Kong	ETA	Yes	Yes	Yes	Yes	Yes (Note: Sources disagree regarding this visa exemption.)	Yes	Yes	Yes	Yes	Yes
Israel	ETA	Yes	Yes	Yes	Yes	No	Yes	Yes	Yes	Yes	Yes
Japan	ETA	Yes	Yes	Yes	Yes	Yes	Yes	Yes	Yes	Yes	Yes
Kiribati	ETA	Yes	Yes	No	Yes	Yes	Yes	Yes	Yes	Yes	Yes
Kuwait	ETA	No	Yes	No	Yes	No	eVisa	eVisa	eVisa	Yes	Yes
Macao	ETA	Yes	Yes	No	No	Yes	Yes	Yes	Yes	Yes	Yes
Malaysia	ETA	Yes	Yes	No	Yes	Yes	Yes	Yes	Yes	Yes	Yes
Maldives	ETA	No	Yes	No	Yes	Yes	Yes	Yes	Yes	Yes	Yes
Marshall Islands	ETA	Yes	Yes	No	No	Yes	Yes	Yes	Yes	Yes	Yes
Mauritius	ETA	Yes	Yes	Yes	Yes	Yes	Yes	Yes	Yes	Yes	Yes
Mexico	ETA	Yes	Yes	Yes	Yes	Yes	Yes	Yes	Yes	Yes	Yes
Micronesia	ETA	Yes	Yes	No	No	Yes	Yes	Yes	Yes	Yes	Yes
Monaco	ETA	Yes	Yes	Yes	Yes	Yes	Yes	Yes	Yes	Yes	Yes
New Zealand	ETA	Yes	Yes	Yes	Yes	Yes	Yes	Yes	Yes	Yes	Yes
Oman	ETA	No	Yes	Yes	Yes	No	eVisa	eVisa	eVisa	Yes	Yes
Palau	ETA	Yes	Yes	No	No	Yes	Yes	Yes	Yes	Yes	Yes
Panama	ETA	Yes	Yes	Yes	Yes	Yes	Yes	Yes	Yes	Yes	Yes
Papua New Guinea	ETA	No	Yes	No	Yes	Yes	Yes	Yes	Yes	Yes	Yes
Paraguay	ETA	Yes	Yes	No	No	Yes	Yes	Yes	Yes	Yes	Yes
Peru	ETA	Yes	Yes	No	No	No	eVisa	eVisa	eVisa	Yes	Yes
Qatar	ETA	No	Yes	Yes	No	No	eVisa	eVisa	eVisa	Yes	Yes
Saint Kitts and Nevis	ETA	Yes	Yes	Yes	Yes	Yes	Yes	Yes	Yes	Yes	Yes
Saint Vincent and the Grenadines	ETA	Yes	Yes	Yes	Yes	Yes	Yes	Yes	Yes	Yes	Yes
Samoa	ETA	Yes	Yes	No	Yes	Yes	Yes	Yes	Yes	Yes	Yes
San Marino	ETA	Yes	Yes	No	Yes	Yes	Yes	Yes	Yes	Yes	Yes
Saudi Arabia	ETA	No	Yes	Yes	No	No	eVisa	eVisa	eVisa	Yes	Yes
Seychelles	ETA	Yes	Yes	Yes	Yes	Yes	Yes	Yes	Yes	Yes	Yes
Singapore	ETA	Yes	Yes	Yes	Yes	Yes	Yes	Yes	Yes	Yes	Yes
Solomon Islands	ETA	Yes	Yes	Yes	Yes	Yes	Yes	Yes	Yes	Yes	Yes
South Korea	ETA	Yes	Yes	Yes	No	Yes	Yes	Yes	Yes	Yes	Yes
Taiwan	ETA	Yes	Yes	Yes	Yes	Yes	Yes	Yes	eVisa	Yes	Yes
Tonga	ETA	Yes	Yes	No	Yes	Yes	Yes	Yes	Yes	Yes	Yes
Tuvalu	ETA	Yes	Yes	No	Yes	Yes	Yes	Yes	Yes	Yes	Yes
United Arab Emirates	ETA	Yes	Yes	Yes	No	No	eVisa	eVisa	eVisa	Yes	Yes
United States	ETA	Yes	Yes	Yes	Yes	Yes	Yes	Yes	Yes	Yes	Yes
Uruguay	ETA	Yes	Yes	No	No	Yes	Yes	Yes	Yes	Yes	Yes
Vatican City	ETA	Yes	Yes	Yes	No	Yes	eVisa	Yes	Yes	Yes	Yes
Albania	No	Yes	No	No	No	No	eVisa	eVisa	eVisa	No	Yes
Armenia	No	No	Yes	No	No	No	eVisa	eVisa	eVisa	No	Yes
Azerbaijan	No	No	Yes	No	No	No	eVisa	eVisa	eVisa	No	Yes
Bangladesh	No	No	No	No	No	Yes	eVisa	Yes	eVisa	No	Yes
Benin	No	No	Yes	No	No	No	eVisa	eVisa	eVisa	No	Yes
Bhutan	No	No	Yes	No	No	No	eVisa	eVisa	eVisa	No	Yes
Bolivia	No	No	Yes	No	No	Yes	eVisa	eVisa	eVisa	No	Yes
Bosnia and Herzegovina	No	Yes	Yes	No	No	No	eVisa	eVisa	eVisa	No	Yes
Botswana	No	No	Yes	Yes	Yes	Yes	Yes	Yes	Yes	Yes	Yes
Burkina Faso	No	No	Yes	No	No	No	eVisa	eVisa	eVisa	No	Yes
Cambodia	No	No	Yes	No	No	No	eVisa	eVisa	eVisa	No	Yes
Cameroon	No	No	No	No	No	No	eVisa	Yes	eVisa	No	Yes
Cape Verde	No	No	Yes	No	No	No	eVisa	eVisa	eVisa	No	Yes
Central African Republic	No	No	Yes	No	No	No	eVisa	eVisa	eVisa	No	Yes
Chad	No	No	Yes	No	No	No	eVisa	eVisa	eVisa	No	Yes
China	No	No	No	Yes	No	Yes	eVisa	eVisa	eVisa	No	Yes
Colombia	No	Yes	No	Yes	No	No	Yes	eVisa	eVisa	No	Yes
Comoros	No	No	Yes	No	No	No	eVisa	eVisa	eVisa	No	Yes
Djibouti	No	No	Yes	No	No	No	eVisa	eVisa	eVisa	No	Yes
Dominica	No	Yes	No	Yes	Yes	Yes	Yes	Yes	Yes	No	Yes
Dominican Republic	No	No	Yes	No	No	No	eVisa	Yes	eVisa	No	Yes
East Timor	No	Yes	No	No	No	Yes	Yes	Yes	Yes	No	Yes
Ecuador	No	No	Yes	Yes	Yes	Yes	eVisa	eVisa	eVisa	No	Yes
El Salvador	No	Yes	No	No	No	Yes	Yes	eVisa	Yes	No	Yes
Equatorial Guinea	No	No	Yes	No	No	No	eVisa	eVisa	eVisa	No	Yes
Eswatini	No	No	No	No	Yes	Yes	eVisa	Yes	eVisa	No	Yes
Fiji	No	No	Yes	Yes	Yes	Yes	eVisa	Yes	eVisa	No	Yes
Gabon	No	No	Yes	No	No	No	eVisa	eVisa	eVisa	No	Yes
Gambia	No	No	No	No	No	Yes	eVisa	Yes	eVisa	No	Yes
Georgia	No	Yes	No	No	No	No	eVisa	eVisa	eVisa	No	Yes
Ghana	No	No	No	No	No	Yes	eVisa	Yes	eVisa	No	Yes
Haiti	No	No	No	No	No	No	eVisa	Yes	eVisa	No	Yes
Honduras	No	Yes	No	No	No	Yes	Yes	Yes	Yes	No	Yes
India	No	No	No	No	No	Yes	eVisa	Yes	eVisa	No	Yes
Jamaica	No	No	No	No	under 15 or over 70	No	eVisa	Yes	eVisa	No	Yes
Kazakhstan	No	No	Yes	No	No	No	eVisa	eVisa	eVisa	No	Yes
Kenya	No	No	No	No	Yes	Yes	eVisa	Yes	eVisa	No	Yes
Kosovo	No	Yes	No	No	No	Yes	eVisa	eVisa	eVisa	No	Yes
Kyrgyzstan	No	No	Yes	No	No	No	eVisa	eVisa	eVisa	No	Yes
Laos	No	No	Yes	No	No	No	eVisa	eVisa	eVisa	No	Yes
Lesotho	No	No	No	Yes	Yes	Yes	eVisa	Yes	eVisa	No	Yes
Madagascar	No	No	Yes	No	No	No	eVisa	eVisa	eVisa	No	Yes
Malawi	No	No	No	No	Yes	Yes	eVisa	Yes	eVisa	No	Yes
Mali	No	No	Yes	No	No	No	eVisa	eVisa	eVisa	No	Yes
Mauritania	No	No	Yes	No	No	No	eVisa	eVisa	eVisa	No	Yes
Moldova	No	Yes	No	No	No	No	eVisa	eVisa	eVisa	No	Yes
Montenegro	No	Yes	Yes	No	No	Yes	eVisa	eVisa	eVisa	No	Yes
Morocco	No	No	Yes	No	No	No	eVisa	eVisa	eVisa	No	Yes
Mozambique	No	No	Yes	No	Yes	No	eVisa	eVisa	eVisa	No	Yes
Myanmar	No	No	No	No	No	No	eVisa	Yes	eVisa	No	Yes
Namibia	No	No	No	No	Yes	Yes	Yes	Yes	Yes	No	Yes
Nauru	No	No	Yes	No	Yes	Yes	Yes	Yes	Yes	Yes	Yes
Nicaragua	No	Yes	Yes	No	No	Yes	Yes	Yes	Yes	Yes	Yes
Niger	No	No	Yes	No	No	No	eVisa	eVisa	eVisa	No	Yes
Nigeria	No	No	No	No	No	No	eVisa	Yes	eVisa	No	Yes
North Macedonia	No	Yes	No	No	No	No	eVisa	eVisa	eVisa	No	Yes
Pakistan	No	No	No	No	No	No	eVisa	Yes	eVisa	No	Yes
Philippines	No	No	Yes	No	No	No	eVisa	eVisa	eVisa	No	Yes
Rwanda	No	No	No	No	No	No	eVisa	Yes	eVisa	No	Yes
Saint Lucia	No	Yes	Yes	Yes	Yes	Yes	Yes	Yes	Yes	Yes	Yes
São Tomé and Príncipe	No	No	Yes	No	No	No	eVisa	eVisa	eVisa	No	Yes
Serbia	No	Yes	No	No	No	Yes	eVisa	eVisa	eVisa	No	Yes
Sierra Leone	No	No	No	No	No	Yes	eVisa	Yes	eVisa	No	Yes
South Africa	No	No	No	Yes	Yes	Yes	eVisa	Yes	Yes	No	Yes
South Sudan	No	No	No	No	No	No	eVisa	eVisa	eVisa	No	Yes
Sri Lanka	No	No	No	No	No	Yes	eVisa	Yes	eVisa	No	Yes
Suriname	No	No	Yes	Yes	No	No	eVisa	Yes	eVisa	No	Yes
Tajikistan	No	No	Yes	No	No	No	eVisa	eVisa	eVisa	No	Yes
Tanzania	No	No	No	No	Yes	Yes	eVisa	Yes	eVisa	No	Yes
Thailand	No	No	Yes	No	No	No	eVisa	eVisa	eVisa	No	Yes
Togo	No	No	Yes	No	No	No	eVisa	eVisa	eVisa	No	Yes
Trinidad and Tobago	No	Yes	No	Yes	Yes	Yes	Yes	Yes	Yes	No	Yes
Tunisia	No	No	Yes	No	No	Yes	eVisa	eVisa	eVisa	No	Yes
Turkey	No	No	No	Yes	No	No	eVisa	eVisa	eVisa	No	Yes
Turkmenistan	No	No	Yes	No	No	No	eVisa	eVisa	eVisa	No	Yes
Uganda	No	No	No	No	No	Yes	eVisa	Yes	eVisa	No	Yes
Ukraine	No	Yes	No	No	No	No	eVisa	eVisa	eVisa	No	Yes
Uzbekistan	No	No	Yes	No	No	No	eVisa	eVisa	eVisa	No	Yes
Vanuatu	No	No	No	No	Yes	Yes	Yes	Yes	Yes	No	Yes
Venezuela	No	Yes	No	No	No	Yes	eVisa	eVisa	eVisa	No	Yes
Western Sahara	No	No	No	No	No	No	Yes	Yes	Yes	No	Yes
Zambia	No	No	Yes	No	Yes	Yes	eVisa	Yes	eVisa	No	Yes
Zimbabwe	No	No	No	No	No	Yes	eVisa	Yes	eVisa	No	Yes
Others	No	No	No	No	No	No	eVisa	eVisa	eVisa	No	Yes

== See also ==
- Visa policy of the United Kingdom
- Visa requirements for British Overseas Territories Citizens
