= Electronic Travel Authorisation (United Kingdom) =

Automated system for travel eligibility to the UK

The United Kingdom Electronic Travel Authorisation (ETA) is an advance travel permission required from visa-exempt foreign nationals who intend to visit the United Kingdom without a visa. The ETA is needed also for visits to the Crown Dependencies but does not apply for visits to the British Overseas Territories.

The system, as part of the Nationality and Borders Act 2022, operates using an online application whose information is checked against security databases. If the system does not find adverse information about the applicant, the travel authorisation is granted automatically, otherwise the application is forwarded to an officer to decide whether to grant the authorisation. The system is expected to provide a response within three working days.

A UK ETA is valid for multiple entries for two years or until the applicant's passport expires, whichever is sooner. It may be used for temporary stays for tourism, visiting family and friends, business, study, certain types of work, or landside transit. Having an ETA does not guarantee entry into the UK.

== History ==
On 9 March 2023, the UK government announced plans for the Electronic Travel Authorisation (ETA) scheme, to replace the Electronic Visa Waiver scheme that was available for nationals of GCC countries, and later require the ETA from other foreign nationals travelling to the UK without a visa.

On 6 June 2023, it was announced that the ETA would cost £10 per applicant.

ETA applications opened for nationals of Qatar on 25 October 2023 for travel from 15 November 2023, and for nationals of other GCC countries and Jordan on 1 February 2024 for travel from 22 February 2024. Nationals of Jordan were removed from the ETA program on 10 September 2024 due to "abuse and violations of the system". Nationals of Colombia also had their ETA privileges revoked on 26 November 2024, after the British embassy in Colombia cited that over the span of two years since visa restrictions on nationals of Colombia were lifted, "there has been a significant increase in the number of Colombians who arrive at UK airports and make unjustified asylum claims". In response, then-President of Colombia Gustavo Petro announced on social media website X that visa requirements on British citizens would be reimposed, due to the country's principle of visa reciprocity.

For visa-free nationalities, ETA applications opened for nationals of non-European countries on 27 November 2024 for travel from 8 January 2025, and for nationals of European countries on 5 March 2025 for travel from 2 April 2025. On 13 March 2025, the Home Office announced that nationals from the island country of Trinidad and Tobago were ineligible to apply for an ETA to visit the United Kingdom, after a reported nine-fold increase of asylum claims from an average of 49 people in 2015–2019 to 439 people reported last year in 2024. Later that year, incumbent minister of state for the Home Office David Hanson, Baron Hanson of Flint announced in a statement made on 14 October 2025, that nationals of Botswana were no longer eligible to apply for an ETA to visit the United Kingdom "due to an increase in the number of nationals of Botswana travelling to the UK for purposes other than those permitted under visitor rules". Access to apply for an ETA was also removed for nationals of Nauru on 9 December 2025, with then-Parliamentary Under-Secretary of State for Migration and Citizenship Mike Tapp citing the country's introduction of a citizenship by investment program as a "significant [risk] to UK border and national security".

Initially, it was intended that visa-exempt travellers would be required to have an ETA even if they were only transiting airside and not passing through passport control. Due to feedback from the tourism and airline industry, the UK government decided to temporarily drop the requirement to hold an ETA if transiting airside, and to keep this exemption under review. ETA eligible nationals who are only transiting airside through the UK are now temporarily exempt from the ETA requirement, however those transiting landside (that is, passing UK border controls) will continue to require an ETA. This exemption is temporary and will be kept under review.

The ETA fee was increased to £16 on 9 April 2025 and to £20 on 8 April 2026.

On 5 March 2026, it was announced that Nicaragua and Saint Lucia would be removed from the ETA eligibility list, with incumbent Home Secretary Shabana Mahmood stating that "their visa-free entry has created a back-door into our country", as the government of Saint Lucia was informed of an "notable increase" of [Saint] Lucians claiming asylum in the UK.

== Nationalities ==
A UK eTA is required for people travelling to the UK on a passport from any of the following visa-exempt countries: However, if the person is also a UK citizen, they are unable to get an ETA on their other visa-exempt passport because an ETA is intended for foreign visitors, not UK citizens.

- European Union member states (except Ireland)
- European Free Trade Association member states
- Andorra
- Antigua and Barbuda
- Argentina
- Australia
- Bahamas
- Bahrain
- Barbados
- Belize
- Brazil
- Brunei
- Canada
- Chile
- Costa Rica
- Grenada
- Guatemala
- Guyana
- Hong Kong
- Israel
- Japan
- Kiribati
- Kuwait
- Macau
- Malaysia
- Maldives
- Marshall Islands
- Mauritius
- Mexico
- Micronesia
- Monaco
- New Zealand
- Oman
- Palau
- Panama
- Papua New Guinea
- Paraguay
- Peru
- Qatar
- Saint Kitts and Nevis
- Saint Vincent and the Grenadines
- Samoa
- San Marino
- Saudi Arabia
- Seychelles
- Singapore
- Solomon Islands
- South Korea
- Taiwan (Note: Only holders of passports with a national identification number.)
- Tonga
- Tuvalu
- United States
- United Arab Emirates
- Uruguay
- Vatican City

== Exemptions ==
The following classes of individuals do not need an ETA:

- British citizens
- British Overseas Territories citizens
- British Nationals (Overseas)
- British subjects and Commonwealth citizens with right of abode in the United Kingdom
- Irish citizens (except those subject to a UK deportation order, exclusion order decision, or an international travel ban)
- Residents of Ireland travelling to the UK from other parts of the Common Travel Area (Ireland, Guernsey, Jersey, and the Isle of Man)
- Holders of an entry clearance or permission to enter or stay in the UK, such as a UK visa, residence permit, pre-settled or settled status
- People who are exempt from immigration control in the UK, such as diplomats, military, airline and ship crew
- Children travelling on a France-UK school trip (special form to be completed)
- People who are eligible for an ETA and are transiting airside through the UK (temporarily) However, those transiting landside (that is, passing UK border controls) will continue to require an ETA.

== Application ==
Applications for an ETA are made preferably through mobile phones using the UK ETA app, available from the App Store and Google Play. Applications can also be made online at a UK government website. Each traveller, including children and babies, must have an individual ETA.

Applicants for an ETA must:

- Upload or take a photo of their original passport
- Scan their passport, if it contains an electronic chip and their mobile device can read it
- Scan their face, except for children aged 9 or younger
- Upload or take a photo of themselves
- Answer questions about their address, job, criminal history, other nationalities, and involvement in war crimes, terrorism or extremism
- If under age 18, provide contact information of someone with parental responsibility for the applicant
- Pay a fee of £20 with a credit card, debit card, Apple Pay, or Google Pay
- Have access to email

The applicant's information is checked against security databases. If the system does not find adverse information about the applicant, the travel authorisation is granted automatically, otherwise the application is forwarded to an officer to decide whether to grant the authorisation. The decision is sent to the applicant by email, usually within three working days.

If approved, the ETA is digitally linked to the applicant's passport, so the applicant does not need to show anything else when entering the UK. The ETA is valid for multiple entries for two years or until the applicant's passport expires, whichever is sooner. The ETA may be used for temporary stays for tourism, visiting family and friends, business, study, certain types of work, or transit.

== Enforcement ==
The Home Office says: "To be fully effective, a traveller’s permission to travel must be checked by the carrier and confirmed prior to travel to the UK. The Government is therefore amending section 40 of the Immigration and Asylum Act 1999 to incentivise carriers to ensure that a traveller holds an ETA or another form of permission, such as a visa or an immigration status in electronic form or risk a civil penalty." The Home Office goes on to say: "Carriers will be expected to confirm that an individual has an appropriate permission to travel, in document or digital form, before they bring them to the UK. Otherwise, they may be liable to a penalty charge. The Home Office will use interactive advance passenger information (API) to confirm whether an individual has permission to travel to the UK and return an electronic message to the carrier advising them whether someone has a permission to travel."

Except for those with right of abode in the UK, such as UK citizens, it is a criminal offence under the Nationality and Borders Act 2022 to obtain or try to obtain an ETA by deception.

== See also ==
- Visa policy of the United Kingdom
- Australian Electronic Travel Authority (ETA)
- Canadian Electronic Travel Authorization (eTA)
- European Travel Information and Authorisation System (ETIAS)
- Israeli Electronic Travel Authorization (ETA-IL)
- New Zealand Electronic Travel Authority (NZeTA)
- Saint Kitts and Nevis Electronic Travel Authorisation (eTA)
- South Korean Electronic Travel Authorization (K-ETA)
- United States Electronic System for Travel Authorization (ESTA)
