= Charitable prom organizations =

Charitable prom organizations are groups, primarily in the United States, that give away prom dresses to high school girls who may not be able to otherwise afford them. One such group, The Glass Slipper Project, works with girls in the Chicago area. The project has been discussed on the website for The Oprah Winfrey Show and in the Chicago Tribune. The Perfect Prom Project is active at the University of Illinois Urbana–Champaign.

Charitable prom organizations in the US are listed on donatemydress.org. Some prom retail stores are also charitable prom organizations. Synchronicity Boutique donated over $10,700 to 240 local high schools that purchased dresses from its store in Baltimore.
