= Triple P =

Triple P may refer to:

- Triple P (album), a 2005 album by Platinum Pied Pipers
- Triple P (parenting program), a parenting-skills program
- Patton Plame, nicknamed Triple P, a fictional character in the TV series NCIS: New Orleans

== See also ==
- PPP (disambiguation)
