= Glass Slipper Project =

Charitable organization

The Glass Slipper Project was one of the first and is one of the largest Charitable Prom Organizations in the U.S. It was founded in 1999 and is based in Chicago Illinois, providing prom dresses and accessories to girls with junior and/or senior status in high schools. The organization has received extensive local and national media attention, including an appearance on The Oprah Winfrey Show during its first year of operation.

The project was inspired by a similar effort undertaken by a homeless shelter in the Washington, DC, area. Since 1999, the Glass Slipper Project has been giving away hundreds of dresses each spring. It operates like a boutique, with a selection of thousands of new and almost-new dresses, shoes and accessories. Students shop for a free outfit, aided by a corps of more than 500 volunteer personal shoppers, and alterations are available on site. The Glass Slipper Project has inspired others to launch prom attire projects all over the country and abroad.

The Glass Slipper Project was founded by Dorian Carter, Katharine Goldberg Shaw and Rachel Hart Klayman, with assistance from Julie Ann Sklaver. While the Chicago Public Schools and private donors provide support for its operation, it is volunteer-run and has no paid staff. It is a 501(c)(3) tax-exempt nonprofit organization.
