= Perfect Prom Project =

U.S. charitable organization

The Perfect Prom Project (PPP) a charitable prom organizations serving Illinois and surrounding states.

The purpose of the Perfect Prom Project is to reach out to the Champaign-Urbana, Illinois community by providing free prom dresses and accessories for high school girls that may not be able to otherwise afford them.

The Perfect Prom Project is a registered organization at the University of Illinois at Urbana-Champaign.

The project was founded in June 2005 by its first president, Autumn Griffin. The Perfect Prom Project held its first annual prom boutique in April 2006 and its second boutique in April 2007. At the boutiques, high school girls from Champaign County, Illinois and surrounding communities selected from over 300 new and gently used prom gowns. 40 dresses were given away at the first annual boutique; 80 dresses were given away at its second. Participants also took home accessories including shoes, purses, make-up, shawls, and more.

The project was inspired by similar initiatives that are happening across the country and plans to give away dresses every spring. Other projects giving away free prom attire for high school students can be found on Youth Noise, AfterProm.org, WordPress.com, and The Glass Slipper Project website - the latter of which also connects persons interested in starting their own charitable prom organizations.

The Perfect Prom Project has received coverage in the Daily Illini , News Gazette , UI7 television station, WCIA , and ABC News Channel 15 WICD-TV .
