= Progressive People's Party =

Progressive People's Party may refer to:

- Progressive People's Party (Germany), in the late German Empire
- Progressive People's Party (Ghana)
- Progressive People's Party (Liberia)
- Progressive People's Party (Molise)
- Vikassheel Insaan Party (India)

== See also ==
- People's Progressive Party (disambiguation)
- Progressive Party (disambiguation)
