= People's Progressive Party =

There are several parties named People's Progressive Party:

- People's Progressive Party (Anguilla)
- People's Progressive Party (Gambia)
- People's Progressive Party (Guyana) (and previously British Guiana)
- People's Progressive Party (Malaysia)
- People's Progressive Party (Nepal)
- People's Progress Party (Papua New Guinea)
- People's Progressive Party (Saint Lucia)
- People's Progressive Party (Solomon Islands)
- People's Progressive Party (Uganda)
- People's Progress Party (Vanuatu)
- United People's Progressive Party, Bulgaria
- Croatian People's Progressive Party from the Croatian parliamentary election, 1906

== See also ==
- Progressive People's Party (disambiguation)
