= Pruritic papular eruption of HIV disease =

Skin condition associated with HIV/AIDS

Pruritic papular eruption (PPE) is characterized chronic pruritus and symmetric papular and pustular on the extensor surfaces of the arms, dorsum of the hands, trunk, and face with sparing of the palms and soles. with the absence of other definable causes of itching in an HIV infected patient. PPE seems to be much more prevalent in less developed regions of the world.

== See also ==
- List of cutaneous conditions
