= Visa policy of the United Kingdom =

Policy on permits required to enter the United Kingdom and the Crown dependencies

The visa policy of the United Kingdom is the policy by which His Majesty's Government determines visa requirements for visitors to the United Kingdom and those seeking to work, study or reside there. The visa policy of the UK also applies to the Crown dependencies of Guernsey, Jersey and the Isle of Man, which each operate their own immigration enforcement and have separate work permit systems. The visa policy does not apply to any of the British Overseas Territories, who generally apply their own visa policies.

Anyone who does not have right of abode in the United Kingdom (British citizens and some Commonwealth citizens, but not some categories of British national) requires leave (permission) to enter the UK. "Visa nationals" must obtain an e-Visa and "non-visa nationals" may travel as a visitor to the UK without a visa for up to 6 months. Since April 2025, all non-visa nationals must apply for an Electronic Travel Authorisation (ETA).

Visas are also required to live, study and work in the UK as a foreign national. Some EU, EEA and Swiss citizens who lived in the UK prior to Brexit are exempt under the EU Settlement Scheme, and long-term foreign residents can apply for indefinite leave to remain, which is approximate to permanent residency in other countries.

The UK maintains the Common Travel Area with the Republic of Ireland and the Crown Dependencies. This means that most citizens of Ireland are exempt from the requirement to hold a visa, residence permit or travel authorisation to enter, study and work in the UK or the Crown Dependencies, and vice versa. The Common Travel Area does not apply to those who are not British or Irish citizens, so other citizens must have the correct permission to enter the UK when crossing the border.

== Visa policy map ==
Visa policy of the United Kingdom The United Kingdom Common Travel Area All types of British nationality (6 months) Electronic Travel Authorisation - ETA (6 months) BIVS (British-Irish Visa Scheme); otherwise, eVisa required for entry and all transit (unless holding exemption documents) eVisa (for entry and landside transit; visa-free airside transit at LHR (Heathrow Airport) or MAN (Manchester Airport) only) eVisa (for entry and all transit)

== Visa exemption ==
The following persons may enter the United Kingdom, the Channel Islands and the Isle of Man without a visa:

=== As of right ===
- British nationals:
  - British citizens
  - British subjects with the right of abode in the United Kingdom
- (Republic of Ireland) Irish citizens (Note: Irish citizens under the Common Travel Area arrangements can freely travel between Ireland and the United Kingdom, and if asked to evidence their identity, any independently issued photographic identity card will be sufficient, unless other facts or circumstances bring Irish citizenship into question. To enable carriers to meet carrier regulations they are required to bear a valid Irish passport or passport card if entering the United Kingdom from a third country.)
- Holders of a certificate of entitlement

People who are citizens of the UK or Ireland and a third country will need a UK or Irish passport to enter the UK, even if they permanently reside in the other country of citizenship. If they have children who are also British citizens or Irish citizens, they will also need a UK or Irish passport if they are joining the parents on a trip to the United Kingdom. Exceptions apply for certain EEA or Swiss citizens, who may use either a British passport, an EEA or Swiss passport, or an EEA or Swiss national identity card.

=== British nationals without right of abode ===
British nationals who are not British citizens may enter the United Kingdom for up to 6 months:

- British nationals:
  - British Nationals (Overseas)
  - British Overseas Territories citizens
  - British Overseas citizens
  - British protected persons
  - British subjects without the right of abode in the United Kingdom

Rules for non-visa nationals
- they must not work for UK clients or in the UK jobs market during their stay in the UK (although study is permitted as a 'student visitor'), with limited exceptions for authorised Permitted Paid Engagements, supported by a registered Certificate of Sponsorship, of up to one month. Being a digital nomad is explicitly allowed, as long as the clients and/or employer is based outside the UK
- they must not register a marriage or register a civil partnership during their stay in the UK
- they can present evidence of sufficient money to fund their stay in the UK (if requested by an Immigration Officer)
- they intend to leave the UK at the end of their visit and can meet the cost of the return (or journey to another country where they intend to and are assured of a legal right to enter)
- if under the age of 18, they can demonstrate evidence of suitable care arrangements and parental (or guardian's) consent for their stay in the UK

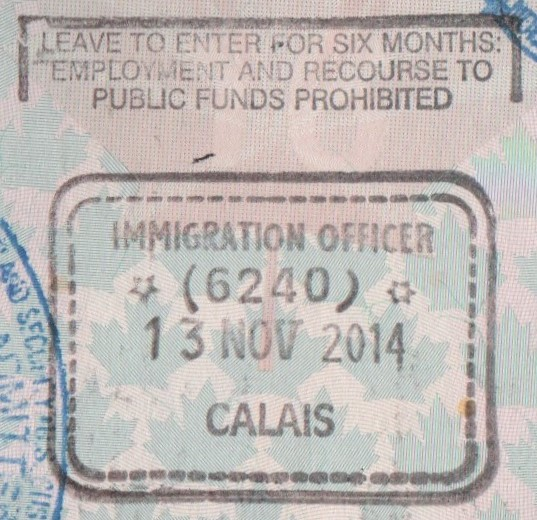
Passport stamp with 6 months' leave to enter endorsed in a pre-biometric Canadian Passport at the juxtaposed controls at the Port of Calais.

Non-visa nationals arriving in the UK from outside the Common Travel Area are assessed by UK immigration officers for "leave to enter." If granted for a regular visit, they receive a passport stamp stating 'Leave to enter for 6 months: employment and recourse to public funds prohibited,' except for nationals who use the ePassport gates, who generally do not receive a stamp. Those who entered using the now-defunct Iris Recognition Immigration System (2004–2013) also did not receive a stamp.

UK Border Force officers can grant leave to enter via fax, email, or orally, including by telephone, for non-visa nationals visiting for up to 6 months. This does not apply when leave has been conferred by another Common Travel Area official.

In some cases, such as certain general aviation flights, travellers may be 'remotely cleared' without inspection, receiving no passport stamp.

Travellers arriving directly from the Republic of Ireland are not routinely checked by the UK Border Force. Under the Immigration (Control of Entry through Republic of Ireland) Order 1972, non-visa nationals are automatically granted 'deemed leave' for 6 months, without the right to work, and without receiving a passport stamp.

Similarly, travel between the UK and the Channel Islands or the Isle of Man involves no routine immigration checks, and no passport stamp is issued. Leave to enter from these Crown Dependencies applies equally in the UK. Travellers arriving in the Crown Dependencies directly from the Republic of Ireland are similarly exempt from routine checks and automatically receive deemed leave for 6 months, with no right to work.

=== Electronic Travel Authorisation (ETA) ===
Since November 2023, the UK has implemented the Electronic Travel Authorisation system.

Citizens of the following countries may obtain an ETA valid for travel in the UK for up to 6 months:

- All European Union member states (except Ireland) (Note: May enter with an ID card if belonging to specific categories.)
- All European Free Trade Association member states
- (Cooperation Council for the Arab States of the Gulf) All Gulf Cooperation Council member states
- Andorra
- Antigua and Barbuda
- Argentina
- Australia
- Bahamas
- Barbados
- Belize
- Brazil
- Brunei
- Canada
- Chile
- Costa Rica
- Grenada
- Guatemala
- Guyana
- Hong Kong (Note: Persons holding a Hong Kong Special Administrative Region passport. See also British National (Overseas) for persons residing in Hong Kong holding a form of British nationality.)
- Israel
- Japan
- Kiribati
- Macau (Note: Persons holding a Macau Special Administrative Region passport.)
- Malaysia
- Maldives
- Marshall Islands
- Mauritius
- Mexico
- Micronesia
- Monaco
- New Zealand
- Palau
- Panama
- Papua New Guinea
- Paraguay
- Peru
- Saint Kitts and Nevis
- Saint Vincent and the Grenadines
- Samoa
- San Marino
- Seychelles
- Singapore
- Solomon Islands
- South Korea
- Taiwan (Note: Only for holders with their personal ID numbers stipulated in their respective passports. Taiwan issues passports without ID numbers to some persons not having the right to reside in Taiwan, including nationals without household registration and certain persons from Hong Kong, Macau, and mainland China.)
- Tonga
- Tuvalu
- United States of America
- Uruguay
- Vatican City

Since April 2025, all visitors with visa-exempt nationalities have needed an ETA to travel to the UK if they do not possess a valid UK visa or citizenship of the UK or Ireland. Since 27 November 2024, ETA applications have been opened for non-visa nationalities outside the European Union, who needed an ETA for any travel to the UK on or after 8 January 2025. This requirement was extended to EU nationals later with applications starting from 5 March and an ETA being mandatory from 2 April. There is a £16 fee for applying and an application can take up to three business days to be processed, though most should be approved or denied within a few hours. If approved, the ETA is valid for stays up to six months for a duration of two years or, if shorter, the date of the holder's passport expiring.

Since 20 May 2019, citizens from Australia, Canada, Japan, New Zealand, Singapore, South Korea, Switzerland, and the United States generally do not receive a stamp, whether using ePassport gates or a staffed desk. However, three categories of these nationals must receive a stamp: those entering for a permitted paid engagement, those with a Tier 5 Certificate of Sponsorship (up to 3 months), or those otherwise required to visit a staffed desk.

=== British-Irish Visa Scheme (BIVS) ===
Citizens of the following countries may travel to the UK without a visa (or an ETA) if they hold a valid Irish visa endorsed with BIVS:

- China
- India

Rules for Irish visa holders
To be eligible for visa-free travel, applicants for Irish visas must apply at a UK/Irish visa application centre in India or China (including Hong Kong and Macau), and first clear immigration in Ireland before arriving in the UK.

Holders of BIVS visas issued by Ireland are only allowed to travel directly from Ireland to the UK and not from other countries, unless transiting in the UK on their ways to Ireland. The length of stay in the UK is no longer than the remaining period of validity of the person's current permission to remain in Ireland. A UK transit visa is not required if the person is transiting through the UK to Ireland by air and arrives in Ireland no later than 23:59 on the day after his or her arrival in the UK.

The scheme might be expanded for all visa requiring nationals in the future.

=== Ukraine scheme ===
- Ukraine
Citizens of Ukraine (and their family members of any nationality) who have a sponsor in the UK may apply online for permission to enter and remain in the UK under the Homes for Ukraine Sponsorship Scheme.

=== Non-ordinary passports ===
In addition to all other visa exempt countries, holders of diplomatic, official, service and special passports of the following countries and territories do not require a visa for tourism, business and official purposes for an Indefinite Period Of Stay (unless otherwise stated) under Diplomatic Visa Waiver (DVW) scheme.

In 2024, it was announced that Diplomatic Visa Arrangement (DVA) visitor visas will be introduced to replace DVWs. DVAs will be required from the following countries’ specified passport holders from 11 March, 2025:

- China^{D SPA}
- Indonesia^{D}
- South Africa^{D}
- Turkey^{D}
- Vietnam^{D}

_{D - Diplomatic passports}
_{SPA - Service and public affairs passports, if travelling with a government minister on an official visit.}

Visa exemption and exemption from immigration control applies to (holders of UN Passport when they travel to the UK on an official visit), (holders of Interpol Passport when on duty) and (employees of NATO and EU when travelling for business or official purposes only).

Date of visa changes

Visa exemption:

Citizens of Antigua and Barbuda, Australia, Bahamas, Barbados, Belize, Brunei, Canada, Cyprus, Grenada, Ireland, Kiribati, Malaysia, Malta, Marshall Islands, Micronesia, New Zealand, Palau, Saint Kitts and Nevis, Saint Vincent and the Grenadines, Samoa, Seychelles, Singapore, Solomon Islands, Tonga and Tuvalu have never required a visa to enter the United Kingdom.

- Unknown: Andorra, Germany, Latvia, Lithuania and Vatican City
- 1 January 1947: France
- 15 February 1947: Belgium and Luxembourg
- 1 March 1947: Norway
- 22 March 1947: Denmark
- 1 April 1947: Sweden
- 15 April 1947: Netherlands
- 24 June 1947: Liechtenstein and Switzerland
- 1 July 1947: Iceland
- 1 January 1948: Italy
- 8 November 1948: Monaco
- 12 November 1948: United States
- 1 October 1949: San Marino
- 16 June 1953: Greece
- 16 December 1954: Finland
- 1 January 1955: Portugal
- 1 January 1960: Mexico
- 15 June 1960: Spain
- 1 March 1961: Uruguay
- 1 June 1961: All other countries of Latin America: Brazil, Chile, Costa Rica, El Salvador, Guatemala, Honduras, Panama and Paraguay
- 2 December 1962: Japan
- 15 March 1967: Israel
- 3 May 1968: Austria (resumed)
- 18 December 1969: South Korea
- 8 June 1990: Argentina (resumed)
- 1 October 1990: Czech Republic (signed as Czechoslovakia) and Hungary
- 25 June 1991: Slovenia
- July 1992: Estonia
- 1 July 1992: Poland
- 1 July 1997: Hong Kong
- 17 April 2002: Macau
- 18 December 2002: Maldives, Mauritius and Papua New Guinea (resumed)
- 18 December 2003: Slovakia (resumed)
- 22 March 2006: Croatia (resumed)
- 1 January 2007: Bulgaria and Romania
- 3 March 2009: Taiwan
- 9 November 2022: Guyana and Peru (resumed)
- 15 November 2023: Qatar
- 22 February 2024: Bahrain, Kuwait, Oman, Saudi Arabia, and the United Arab Emirates

Electronic Visa

- 1 January 2014: Oman, Qatar and United Arab Emirates
- 6 April 2016: Kuwait
- 1 June 2022: Bahrain and Saudi Arabia

Diplomatic and service passports:

- 25 October 2007: China (conditional) (diplomatic, service passports and public affairs passports accompanying a Minister or above for the purpose of an official visit)
- 6 April 2011: Oman, Qatar and United Arab Emirates (diplomatic and special passports)
- 9 January 2012: Turkey (diplomatic passports)
- 1 October 2013: Kuwait (diplomatic and special passports)
- 30 December 2013: Vatican (service and temporary service passports)
- 6 April 2014: Bahrain (diplomatic and special passports)
- 3 August 2015: South Africa (diplomatic passports)
- 8 October 2015: Vietnam (diplomatic passports)
- 6 April 2016: Indonesia (diplomatic passports)

Cancelled:

- Visa free travels was cancelled because of the World War II with following countries: Belgium, Denmark, France, Greece, Iceland, Italy, Liechtenstein, Luxembourg, Monaco, Netherlands, Norway, San Marino, Sweden, Switzerland (All have been resumed in 1940s - 1950s) 1938: Austria (was resumed in 1968) 21 May 1938: Germany (was resumed)
- 24 January 1973: Cuba
- 19 May 1980: Iran
- 1982: Argentina (was resumed in 1990)
- 1985: Sri Lanka
- 1986: Bangladesh, Ghana, India and Pakistan
- 1 February 1987: Nigeria
- 1989: Haiti
- 22 June 1989: Turkey
- 1 April 1990: Algeria, Morocco and Tunisia
- 3 October 1990: East Germany
- 1991: Uganda
- 1992: Yugoslavia (current as Bosnia and Herzegovina, Montenegro, North Macedonia and Serbia)
- 1 October 1994: Ivory Coast and Sierra Leone
- 27 October 1995: Gambia
- 5 January 1996: Tanzania
- 8 March 1996: Kenya
- 4 April 1996: Bahrain, Dominican Republic, Fiji, Guyana, Kuwait, Maldives, Mauritius, Niger, Papua New Guinea, Peru, Qatar, Suriname, United Arab Emirates and Zambia (Maldives, Mauritius and Papua New Guinea were resumed in 2002, Guyana and Peru were resumed in 2022)
- 27 May 1997: Colombia(was resumed in 2022 until 26 November 2024)
- 1 August 1997: Ecuador
- 8 October 1998: Slovakia (was resumed in 2003)
- 19 November 1999: Croatia (was resumed in 2006)
- 9 November 2002: Zimbabwe
- 9 January 2003: Jamaica
- 2 March 2006: Malawi
- 18 May 2009: Bolivia
- 3 March 2009: South Africa
- 1 July 2009: Eswatini and Lesotho
- 5 May 2014: Venezuela
- 11 May 2022: El Salvador
- 19 July 2023: Dominica, Honduras, Namibia, Timor-Leste and Vanuatu
- 10 September 2024: Jordan
- 26 November 2024: Colombia
- 12 March 2025: Trinidad and Tobago
- 14 October 2025: Botswana
- 9 December 2025: Nauru
- 5 March 2026: Nicaragua, Saint Lucia

== Transit ==
There are 2 types of transit through the United Kingdom under the United Kingdom Transit Rules - airside transit and landside transit. The Transit Without Visa facility for visa requiring nationals was abolished, effective 1 December 2014, and replaced with United Kingdom Transit Rules. Notwithstanding the lists below, in general, even persons from 'Direct Airside transit visa-exempt nationalities' require a transit visa if transiting though the UK to other parts of the Common Travel Area including Ireland.

With the introduction of the Electronic Travel Authorisation system, an ETA or other permission to enter the UK will be required from any passenger needing to pass immigration control, even if that passenger is only in transit. An ETA will not be required for non-visa nationals transiting through Heathrow or Manchester airports to a non-UK or Irish destination without passing border control (i.e. Airside Transit in the list below).

Airside transit

- Available only at London Heathrow Airport and Manchester Airport
- Available only to passengers arriving and departing by air to an international destination (non-stop) other than Ireland on the same day.
- Available only to passengers not leaving the airside zone of the airport and not passing through immigration control.
- Concerns passengers who would normally require a visitor visa to enter the United Kingdom but who hold a Direct Airside Transit visa, a passport of an airside transit visa-exempt country, or an airside transit visa exemption document, or a direct airside transit ETA.

Landside transit

- Available only to passengers arriving and departing by air by 23:59 the next day who require passing through immigration control and leaving the airport building only for transit purposes.
- Concerns passengers who would normally require a visitor visa to enter the United Kingdom but who hold a Visitor in Transit visa, landside transit ETA, or a landside visa exemption document.

Airside transit visa-exempt citizens

- Armenia
- Azerbaijan
- Benin
- Bhutan
- Bolivia
- Bosnia and Herzegovina
- Burkina Faso
- Cambodia
- Cape Verde
- Central African Republic
- Chad
- Comoros
- Cuba
- Djibouti
- Dominican Republic
- Ecuador
- Equatorial Guinea
- Fiji
- Gabon
- Haiti
- Indonesia
- Kazakhstan
- Kyrgyzstan
- Laos
- Madagascar
- Mali
- Mauritania
- Montenegro
- Morocco
- Mozambique
- Niger
- North Korea
- Philippines
- São Tomé and Príncipe
- Suriname
- Taiwan (Note: Holders of passports that do not contain a personal identification number.)
- Tajikistan
- Thailand
- Togo
- Tunisia
- Turkmenistan
- Ukraine
- Uzbekistan
- Venezuela (Note: Holders of biometric passports only.)
- Zambia
- (United Nations) Stateless persons holding UN Convention 1954 travel documents and refugees whose original nationality is exempt.

Airside transit visa exemption documents

The exemption applies where travellers:

- arrive and depart by air, and
- the onward flight must be confirmed, and must depart the same day, and
- have proper documentation for their destination (including a visa for the destination country if necessary), and
- fulfil any one of the below conditions:
1. have a valid visa for Australia, Canada, New Zealand or the US, whether or not travelling to or from those countries, or
2. have a valid Australian or New Zealand residence visa; or
3. have a valid Canadian permanent resident card issued on or after 28 June 2002; or
4. have a valid uniform format residence permit issued by an EEA state under Council Regulation (EC) number 1030/2002; or
5. have a valid Irish biometric visa endorsed BC or BC BIVS; or
6. have a valid uniform format category D visa for entry to a state in the European Economic Area (EEA); or
7. have a valid US I-551 permanent resident card issued on or after 21 April 1998; or
8. have an expired I-551 permanent resident card issued on or after 21 April 1998, accompanied by an I-797 extension letter; or
9. have a standalone US Immigration Form 155A/155B attached to an envelope; or
10. have a valid Schengen Approved destination Scheme (ADS) group tourism visa where the holder is travelling to the country that issued it or holds a valid airline ticket from the Schengen area, provided the holder can demonstrate they entered there no more than 30 days previously on the basis of a valid Schengen ADS visa;

eVisas or e-residence permits are not acceptable for airside transit unless the airline is able to verify it with the issuing country. Nationals of Syria who are holders of US B1/B2 visas are not visa-exempt.

Visitor in Transit visa exemption documents

The exemption applies where travellers:

- arrive and depart by air, and
- the onward flight must be confirmed, and must depart by 23:59 the following day, and
- have proper documentation for their destination (including the correct visa or exemption document for the destination country ), and
- fulfil any one of the below conditions:
1. have a valid entry visa for Australia, Canada, New Zealand or the US, and a valid airline ticket for travel via the UK, as part of a reasonable journey to or from one of those countries, or
2. have a valid airline ticket for travel via the UK as part of a reasonable journey from Australia, Canada, New Zealand or the US, if they are transiting the UK no more than 6 months after the date when they last entered Australia, Canada, New Zealand or the US with a valid entry visa for that country; or
3. have a valid Australian or New Zealand residence visa; or
4. have a valid Canadian permanent resident card issued on or after 28 June 2002; or
5. have a valid uniform format residence permit issued by an EEA state under Council Regulation (EC) number 1030/2002; or
6. have a valid Irish biometric visa endorsed BC or BC BIVS and be travelling to Ireland; or
7. be travelling from Ireland and it is less than three months since given permission to stay in Ireland by the Irish immigration official with a valid Irish biometric visa, or
8. have a valid uniform format category D visa for entry to a state in the European Economic Area (EEA); or
9. have a valid US I-551 permanent resident card issued on or after 21 April 1998; or
10. have an expired I-551 permanent resident card issued on or after 21 April 1998, accompanied by an I-797 extension letter; or
11. have a standalone US Immigration Form 155A/155B attached to an envelope;

eVisas such as those regularly issued by Australia or e-residence permits are not acceptable for landside transit.

== Electronic visa (e-Visa) ==
Home Office has introduced an e-Visa; keeping immigration records on the UKVI digital database and replacing physical documents, such as Biometric Resident Permits and Biometric Resident Cards which most of them expired by the end of 2024; since April 2024. Most long-stay immigrants are invited to create a UKVI account on GOV.UK website and link it to their travel documents.

This rollout brought some concerns over elderly who holds legacy immigration documents and have limitations in accessing digital infrastructure. Also, there are several reports that various sectors, including the public service, refused eVisa as a proof of right to remain.

Since 1 July 2026, all successful visa applicants will be issued only an e-Visa.

Travelers must still submit their biometrics in person by going to a visa application center, unless they are eligible to use the ID Check app. Currently, the ID Check app is only available to EU, EEA, Swiss, British National (Overseas), and Hong Kong Special Administrative Region passport holders.

== Obtaining an entry visa ==
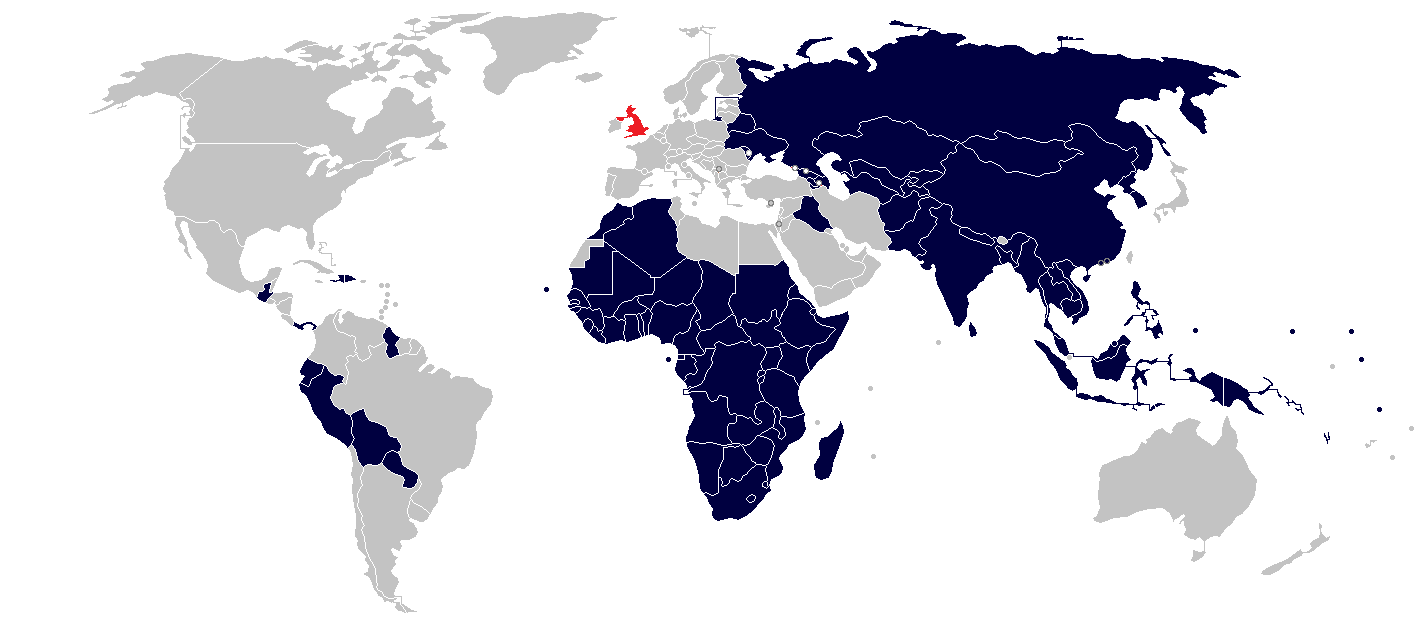
Mandatory tuberculosis testing for a long term UK visa

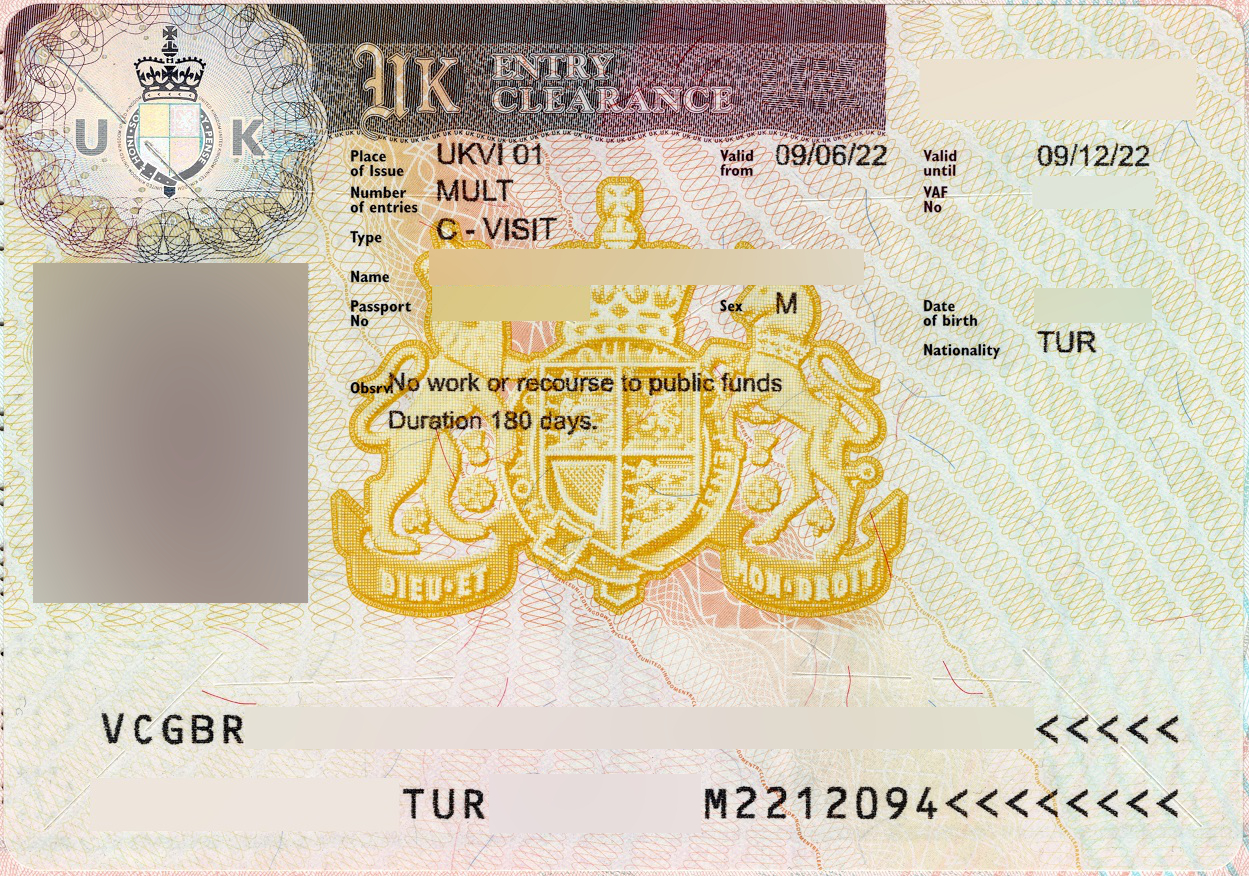
A contemporary UK visa in a Turkish citizen's passport

A pre-Brexit (EU type) UK visa in a Russian student's passport

Visitors entering the UK, the Channel Islands and/or the Isle of Man who do not qualify for one of the visa exemptions listed above have to apply for a visa in advance through the UK Visas and Immigration at a visa application centre.

All visitors must apply by registering an online account (except citizens of North Korea who must apply in person at the British Embassy), fill in the application form, pay the fee and attend an appointment at a visa application centre.

A visitor's visa for a single stay or multiple stays of up to 6 months costs £135. A multiple-entry visitor's visa valid for 2 years costs £506, 5 years £506, and 10 years £1128. Mainland Chinese citizens can, for certain common forms of travel, obtain a 2-year, multiple-entry visitor's visa at a cost of £115. Being a digital nomad is explicitly allowed on a standard visitor visa as long as the clients or employer are not based in the UK and there is no access to the UK jobs market.

Family members of EU, EEA and Swiss citizens who are not covered by one of the visa exemptions above can apply for an EEA Family Permit free of charge (instead of a visa).

Applicants for most UK visas, including visitor visas and EEA Family Permits, must submit biometric identifiers (fingerprints and a digital facial image). Exemptions from biometrics apply to diplomats, foreign officials, Commonwealth Forces, those transferring a visa vignette to a new passport, and travellers going directly to the Channel Islands or Gibraltar without passing through the UK or Isle of Man. Children must be accompanied when providing biometrics, which may be shared with foreign governments and are destroyed 10 years after capture. Most visa applications are decided within 3 weeks.

Applicants resident in the following countries and territories who wish to enter the UK for 6 months or more are required to be tested for tuberculosis as part of the visa application process:

- Afghanistan
- Algeria
- Angola
- Armenia
- Azerbaijan
- Bangladesh
- Belarus
- Benin
- Bolivia
- Botswana
- Brunei
- Burkina Faso
- Burma
- Burundi
- Cambodia
- Cameroon
- Cape Verde
- Central African Republic
- Chad
- China
- Congo
- DR Congo
- Djibouti
- Dominican Republic
- East Timor
- Ecuador
- Equatorial Guinea
- Eritrea
- Eswatini
- Ethiopia
- Gabon
- Gambia
- Georgia
- Ghana
- Guatemala
- Guinea
- Guinea-Bissau
- Guyana
- Haiti
- Hong Kong
- India
- Indonesia
- Iraq
- Ivory Coast
- Kazakhstan
- Kenya
- Kiribati
- Kyrgyzstan
- Laos
- Lesotho
- Liberia
- Macau
- Madagascar
- Malawi
- Malaysia
- Mali
- Marshall Islands
- Mauritania
- Micronesia
- Moldova
- Mongolia
- Morocco
- Mozambique
- Namibia
- Nepal
- Niger
- Nigeria
- North Korea
- Pakistan
- Palau
- Panama
- Papua New Guinea
- Paraguay
- Peru
- Philippines
- Russia
- Rwanda
- São Tomé and Príncipe
- Senegal
- Sierra Leone
- Solomon Islands
- Somalia
- South Africa
- South Korea
- South Sudan
- Sri Lanka
- Sudan
- Tajikistan
- Tanzania
- Thailand
- Togo
- Turkmenistan
- Tuvalu
- Uganda
- Ukraine
- Uzbekistan
- Vanuatu
- Vietnam
- Zambia
- Zimbabwe

After a person has successfully obtained a UK visa, if they subsequently obtain a new passport, but the UK visa in their old passport still has remaining validity, they are not required to have the UK visa vignette affixed in the old passport transferred to the new passport, but must be able to present both the new and old passports at passport control when entering the UK.

If a person who has successfully obtained a UK visa subsequently loses the passport in which the visa vignette is affixed (or if it is stolen), they have to pay the original visa fee in full again and may be required to show that their circumstances have not changed when applying for a replacement visa. However, a new 'confirmation of acceptance for studies' (CAS)/'certificate of sponsorship' (COS) is not required when applying for a replacement Tier 4/Tier 2 visa.

== Visa types ==
These are correct as of April 2015.

=== Visitor visas ===
- Standard Visitor visa
- Marriage Visitor visa
- Permitted Paid Engagement visa
- Parent of a Child Student visa
- Visa to pass through the UK in transit
  - Direct Airside Transit visa
  - Visitor in Transit visa

=== Work visas ===
As of September 2023:

- Charity Worker visa (Temporary Work)
- Creative Worker visa (Temporary Work)
- Exempt vignette
- Frontier Worker permit
- Global Talent visa
- Government Authorised Exchange visa (Temporary Work)
- Graduate Trainee visa (Global Business Mobility)
- Graduate visa
- Health and Care Worker visa
- High Potential Individual (HPI) visa
- Innovator Founder visa (formerly Innovator visa)
- International Agreement visa (Temporary Work)
- International Sportsperson visa
- Minister of Religion visa (T2)
- Overseas Domestic Worker visa
- Religious Worker visa (Temporary Work)
- Representative of an Overseas Business visa
- Scale-up Worker visa
- Seasonal Worker visa (Temporary Work)
- Secondment Worker visa (Global Business Mobility)
- Senior or Specialist Worker visa (Global Business Mobility)
- Service providers from Switzerland visa
- Service Supplier visa (Global Business Mobility)
- Skilled Worker visa
- UK Ancestry visa
- UK Expansion Worker visa (Global Business Mobility)
- Youth Mobility Scheme visa

Closed for new applications:

- Entrepreneur visa (Tier 1)
- Investor visa (Tier 1)
- Start-up visa
- Turkish Businessperson visa
- Turkish Worker visa

=== Student visas ===
Since October 2020, Tier 4 Visa route has been replace by Student Visa route.

- Short-term study visa
- Student visa
- Child Student visa

=== Humanitarian scheme visas ===
- Ukraine Permission Extension scheme
- British National (Overseas) visa

== History ==
Visa policy of the UK from 1960 to the present United Kingdom or British Empire Visa-free access (subject to UK arrival with credible presentation as a visitor)

By early 1917, all aliens (i.e. persons who were not British subjects) were required to obtain visas from a British consul before embarking for the United Kingdom. Visa requirements would then be maintained for aliens under the peacetime regime of immigration control retained after 1918.

Visas were mutually abolished between the UK and France in July 1921, although this did not apply to French overseas territories or the rest of the British Empire.

Visa fee reduction between the UK and the United States had been discussed as early as 1925. They were mutually reduced by 80 per cent on 1 April 1937; by February 1938, such fees had already been abolished between the US and most European countries, but American citizens continued being required visas for entry into the UK until 1948.

=== Post-World War II ===
Members of the British Empire had been considered British subjects before the war and did not generally need visas; this did not apply to mandated territories such as South West Africa or Western Samoa, whose residents did need visas but were eligible to stay indefinitely. As dominions became more independent and adopted their own nationality laws, however, visa restrictions started to be applied.

The abolition of visa requirements was increased in post-war era as part of a policy to make travel freer and easier; by 1949 visa requirements had been abolished in 20 countries.

Although waiving visas or visa charges for United States citizens was discussed as early as 1930, such visas would remain until 1948, when the UK abolished such visas and the US waived visa fees and doubled visa lengths for UK citizens, albeit stopping short at full visa abolition due to domestic considerations; MP Phil Piratin was denied a visa.

=== Modern history ===
In March 2007, the Home Office announced that it would carry out its first Visa Waiver Test to review the list of countries and territories outside the European Union, European Economic Area and Switzerland whose nationals are exempt from holding a visa for the UK.

After carrying out the review, in July 2008, Jacqui Smith, the Home Secretary, and David Miliband, the Foreign Secretary, announced to Parliament that the results of the test showed a 'strong case' for introducing visa regimes for 11 countries (Bolivia, Botswana, Brazil, Lesotho, Malaysia, Mauritius, Namibia, South Africa, Swaziland, Trinidad and Tobago and Venezuela) having taken into account the following factors (including the extent to which they were being addressed by the countries' authorities):

- Passport security and integrity
- The degree of co-operation over deportation or removal of the countries' nationals from the UK
- Levels of illegal working in the UK and other immigration abuse (such as fraudulent asylum claims)
- Levels of crime and terrorism risk posed to the UK

Following the July 2008 announcement, the UK Government entered into a 6-month period of 'detailed dialogue' with the governments of the 11 countries 'to examine how risks can be reduced in a way that obviates the need for a visa regime to be introduced'. In order to maintain visa-free access to the UK, the 11 countries had to 'demonstrate a genuine commitment to put into effect credible and realistic plans, with clear timetables, to reduce the risks to the UK, and begin real implementation of these plans by the end of the dialogue period'.

On 9 January 2009, the new visa rules announced required citizens of Bolivia, Lesotho, South Africa and Swaziland to obtain a visa, and only Venezuelan nationals travelling on biometric passports with an electronic chip issued since 2007 could continue to enter the UK without a visa. The existing visa-free status for citizens of Botswana, Brazil, Malaysia, Mauritius, Namibia and Trinidad and Tobago was maintained.

Starting from 3 March 2009, a transitional regime was put in place until 30 June 2009 for South African citizens - those who held a valid South African passport and had previously entered the UK lawfully using that passport could continue to enter the UK without a visa, whilst all other South African citizens were required to apply for a visa. On the same day, Taiwan citizens were able to enter the UK without a visa. On 18 May 2009, Bolivian citizens were no longer able to enter the UK without a visa and Venezuelan citizens were required to present a biometric passport to enter the UK without a visa. On 1 July 2009, all South African citizens were required to apply for a visa to enter the UK. On the same day, citizens of Lesotho and Swaziland were required to apply for a visa to enter the UK.

On 30 March 2010, Alan Johnson, the Home Secretary, and David Miliband, the Foreign Secretary, announced to Parliament that, having carried out a review of visa regimes in relation to Eastern Caribbean countries, 5 countries (Antigua and Barbuda, Barbados, Grenada, St Kitts and Nevis and St Vincent and the Grenadines) would have their visa-free status maintained. At the same time, the UK Government would enter a six-month period of 'detailed dialogue' with the governments of 2 countries (Dominica and St Lucia), who would have to 'demonstrate a genuine commitment to put into effect credible and realistic plans, with clear timetables, to reduce the risks to the UK, and begin implementing these plans by the end of the dialogue period' to maintain their visa-free status. On 2 March 2011, Theresa May, the Home Secretary, and William Hague, the Foreign Secretary, announced to Parliament that the governments of Dominica and St Lucia 'have made concrete improvements to the immigration, border control and identity systems which would not have happened without the test', and so the visa-free status for the 2 countries would be maintained.

On 13 June 2011, new Immigration Rules were laid before Parliament that came into force on 4 July 2011 introducing a new streamlined application procedure (waiving the normal requirements to provide documentary evidence of maintenance and qualifications at the time of application) for some non-visa nationals from 'low-risk countries' who wish to study in the UK for more than 6 months and apply for Tier 4 entry clearance. The following 15 countries and territories were categorised as 'low-risk' and included in 'Appendix H' of the Immigration Rules: Argentina, Australia, Brunei, Canada, Chile, Croatia, Hong Kong, Japan, New Zealand, Singapore, South Korea, Taiwan, Trinidad and Tobago and the United States. Although the announcement did not relate to a Visa Waiver Test per se, it showed that the UK Border Agency considers some countries and territories in the list of visa-free nationalities to be lower risk than others. In particular, Trinidad and Tobago, which was considered to be a high-risk country from a visa regime perspective in 2008 when the Visa Waiver Test was carried out, was now viewed by the UK Border Agency as a low-risk country. On 5 September 2012, two more countries (Botswana and Malaysia) were added to the list of 'low-risk' nationalities for the purpose of Tier 4 entry clearance applications, i.e. 'Appendix H', (taking effect on 1 October 2012), whilst on 6 September 2013, Barbados was also added to 'Appendix H' (taking effect on 1 October 2013). Again, although the announcement did not relate to a Visa Waiver Test per se, it showed that Botswana, Malaysia and Barbados (countries which were considered to be a high-risk countries from a visa regime perspective when the Visa Waiver Test was carried out in 2008 in the case of Botswana and Malaysia, and in 2010 in the case of Barbados) were now viewed by the UK Border Agency as low-risk countries.

In March 2013, it was revealed that Theresa May, the Home Secretary, was considering removing Brazil from the list of visa-exempt nationalities due to concerns about illegal immigration, since Brazil was fifth in the top 10 of illegal immigrant nationalities in the UK according to Home Office figures for 2011, and was the only country on the list for which short-term visitors do not need a visa. However, the UK Government later decided to retain the visa exemption for Brazilian citizens, a decision which was seen as attempting to develop closer trading links with Brazil.

On 1 January 2014, an electronic visa waiver (EVW) scheme was introduced, enabling citizens of Oman, Qatar and the United Arab Emirates who have obtained an EVW authorisation online to visit and / or study in the UK for up to 6 months without a visa; with Kuwait added to the EVW scheme during February 2016.

After 'assessing countries against a list of risk and compliance criteria', the UK Government added Kuwait, Oman, Qatar and the UAE to 'Appendix H' (the list of 'low-risk' nationalities for the purpose of Tier 4 student visa applications) at various periods between 2014 and 2018 but according to the Cambridge Education Group, Oman was to be removed from this Appendix. However, it doesn't seem like this may have occurred.

These 2 changes reflect the UK Government's view that Kuwait, Oman, Qatar and the UAE should now be regarded as low-risk countries from a visa regime perspective and it is possible that, in future, nationals of these four countries will be classified as non-visa nationals (enabling them to visit and/or study in the UK without a visa for up to 6 months without having to obtain an EVW authorisation online every time they wish to enter the UK).

On 13 March 2014, the UK Government announced that, with effect from 5 May 2014, Venezuelan citizens (including those with biometric passports) would require a visa to enter the UK.

In January 2020, British ambassador to Ukraine announced that there would be no visa-free arrangements for Ukrainian citizens.

On April 9, 2020, the Home Office issued a new immigration rule imposing visa restriction on low-skilled people workers with effect from January 2021. The restriction introduced a new point-based immigration system, allotting points for certain skills, salaries, qualification and shortage occupations. Any worker with points falling below the given threshold will be restricted from applying for UK work visa, as per the new immigration rule. Free Movement, a UK-based website updating, commenting, training and advising on immigration and asylum laws, claims that nurses, hospital porters, cleaners, postal workers, etc., are to be worst affected by the new immigration law.

In February 2021, the UK's new visa scheme stated that Hong Kong residents with a British National (Overseas) passport can stay in the UK for five years and get full citizenship.

In May 2022, a new visa scheme was offered to graduates from the world's top 50 universities, giving them a two year long work visa with the opportunity to prolong it if they meet certain requirements.

From 4 August 2022, police registration is no longer required.

== Reciprocity ==
Of the countries and territories whose citizens are granted a visa-free stay for up to 6 months in the UK:

- The following fully reciprocate, granting British citizens a visa-free stay for up to 6 months: Andorra, Antigua and Barbuda, Bahamas, Barbados, Canada, Grenada, Hong Kong, Macao, Mexico, Monaco, New Zealand, Panama, Saint Vincent and the Grenadines, San Marino, Vatican City. Some of these countries require an electronic authorisation before travel: Canada (eTA for travel by air, fee of 7 CAD), New Zealand (NZeTA, fee of 17 NZD by app or 23 NZD online, plus IVL of 100 NZD).
- The following grant a visa-free stay for up to 90 days or 3 months: Schengen Area, Argentina, Australia, Brazil, Brunei, Chile, Costa Rica, Cyprus, Guatemala, Guyana, Israel, Japan, Malaysia, Nicaragua, Paraguay, Peru, Saint Kitts and Nevis, Singapore, Solomon Islands, South Korea, Taiwan (however, British citizens can extend this initial 90 days to 180 days once in Taiwan under the principle of reciprocity because Taiwanese citizens enjoy 180-day visa-free entry to the UK), United States, Uruguay. Some of these countries require an electronic authorisation before travel: Australia (eVisitor, no fee), Israel (ETA-IL, fee of 25 ILS), United States (ESTA, fee of 21 USD).
- The following grant a visa-free stay for up to 30 days or 1 month: Belize, Kiribati, Maldives, Marshall Islands, Micronesia, Palau, Seychelles, Tonga, Tuvalu, United Arab Emirates.
- The following grant a visa-free stay for other periods: Mauritius (60 days for tourism, 90 days for business), Oman (14 days), Saint Lucia (6 weeks), Samoa (60 days).
- The following grant a visa on arrival or electronic visa: Bahrain (2 weeks to 6 months, 5 to 65 BHD), Kuwait (90 days, 3 KWD), Papua New Guinea (60 days, 100 PGK for tourism or 500 PGK for business), Qatar (30 days, no fee), Saudi Arabia (6 months).

== Visitor statistics ==
Most visitors arriving to United Kingdom were from the following countries of nationality. Note the statistics for Ireland are fluid; no visitor conditions attach and visits across the land border are not counted.

Nationality	Total								
Nationality	2019	2018	2017	2016	2015	2014	2013	2012	2011
United States	▲4,499,000	▼3,877,000	▲3,910,000	▲3,455,000	▲3,266,000	▲2,976,000	▼2,778,000	▼2,840,000	▲2,846,000
France	▼3,561,000	▼3,693,000	▼3,956,000	▼4,064,000	▲4,171,000	▲4,114,000	▲3,974,000	▲3,787,000	▲3,633,000
Germany	▼3,233,000	▼3,262,000	▲3,380,000	▲3,341,000	▲3,249,000	▲3,220,000	▲3,048,000	▲2,967,000	▼2,947,000
Ireland	▲2,851,000	▼2,782,000	▲3,029,000	▲2,897,000	▲2,632,000	▲2,486,000	▼2,350,000	▼2,453,000	▼2,574,000
Spain	▼2,319,000	▲2,530,000	▲2,413,000	▲2,397,000	▲2,197,000	▲1,986,000	▲1,746,000	▼1,716,000	▲1,836,000
Italy	▲2,197,000	▲1,808,000	▼1,779,000	▲1,990,000	▲1,794,000	▲1,757,000	▲1,636,000	▼1,521,000	▲1,526,000
Netherlands	▲1,987,000	▼1,954,000	▲2,136,000	▲2,062,000	▼1,897,000	▲1,972,000	▲1,891,000	▼1,735,000	1,789,000
Poland	▼1,651,000	▲1,817,000	▼1,807,000	▲1,921,000	▲1,707,000	▲1,494,000	▲1,339,000	▲1,222,000	▼1,057,000
Belgium	▲1,135,000	▼1,116,000	▲1,148,000	▼1,048,000	▲1,175,000	▼1,122,000	▲1,174,000	▲1,113,000	▼984,000
Australia	▲1,063,000	▼1,003,000	▲1,092,000	▼982,000	▼1,043,000	▼1,057,000	▲1,058,000	▼993,000	▲1,093,000
China	▲1,010,000	▲472,000	▲406,000	▼307,000	▲325,000	▼233,000	▲237,000	▲215,000	181,000
Switzerland	▲926,000	▼808,000	▲989,000	▲940,000	▲872,000	▲864,000	▼807,000	▲832,000	▲768,000
Romania	▼902,000	▲987,000	▲944,000	▲891,000	▲693,000	▲471,000	▲377,000	▲267,000	▲259,000
Canada	▲874,000	▲850,000	▲835,000	▲828,000	▲708,000	▼649,000	▲731,000	▼704,000	▲740,000
Sweden	▼789,000	▼827,000	▲831,000	▼821,000	▼850,000	▲869,000	▲784,000	▼777,000	▲794,000
India	▲692,000	▼511,000	▲562,000	▼415,000	▲422,000	▲390,000	▲373,000	▼339,000	▼355,000
Denmark	▼691,000	▲735,000	– 730,000	▼730,000	▲756,000	▼662,000	▲696,000	▲636,000	▲614,000
Norway	▼647,000	▼673,000	▲712,000	▼700,000	▼771,000	▲874,000	▲838,000	▲771,000	▲739,000
Portugal	▲613,000	▼431,000	▼482,000	▲492,000	▼392,000	▲395,000	▼285,000	▲292,000	▼283,000
United Arab Emirates	▲553,000	▲392,000	▲374,000	▲365,000	▲347,000	▼260,000	▲304,000	▲256,000	▲241,000
Czech Republic	▲414,000	▲412,000	▼375,000	▼414,000	▲465,000	▼352,000	▲356,000	▲325,000	▲286,000
Hong Kong	▲409,000	▲243,000	▲230,000	▲218,000	▲204,000	▼159,000	▲163,000	▼135,000	▲149,000
Japan	▲389,000	– 247,000	▲247,000	▲246,000	▼194,000	▼222,000	▼225,000	▲243,000	▲237,000
Austria	▲342,000	▲322,000	▲307,000	▲302,000	▲277,000	▼263,000	▲275,000	▼268,000	▼271,000
Hungary	▼334,000	▲437,000	▲415,000	▲397,000	▲328,000	▲323,000	▲276,000	▲262,000	▼210,000
Turkey	▲334,000	▼177,000	▲230,000	▲196,000	▼192,000	▲196,000	▲154,000	▲145,000	▼126,000
Brazil	▲291,000	▼240,000	▲244,000	▼187,000	▲324,000	▲293,000	▼258,000	▼260,000	▲276,000
Israel	▼265,000	▲278,000	▲265,000	▲209,000	▲205,000	▲185,000	▲179,000	▼138,000	▲164,000
Greece	▲250,000	▼200,000	▼213,000	▲227,000	▼225,000	▲238,000	▲181,000	▼159,000	▲225,000
Lithuania	▼236,000	▲372,000	▲327,000	▼242,000	▲271,000	▼198,000	▲202,000	▼171,000	▲178,000
Bulgaria	▼235,000	▲266,000	▲262,000	▲248,000	▼173,000	▲184,000	▼125,000	▲138,000	▲97,000
South Africa	▼217,000	▼224,000	▲230,000	▼188,000	▲231,000	▼217,000	▲225,000	▲211,000	▼194,000
Finland	▲215,000	▼214,000	▼258,000	▲261,000	▼245,000	▲255,000	▲212,000	▼208,000	▲233,000
Nigeria	▲208,000	▼107,000	▲119,000	▼101,000	▼128,000	▼134,000	▲157,000	▲154,000	▼142,000
Russia	▲199,000	▼181,000	▲227,000	▼147,000	▼164,000	▲249,000	▼214,000	▲227,000	211,000
Malta	▲190,000	▼72,000	▲104,000	▲87,000	▼74,000	▲100,000	▲85,000	▲65,000	▼64,000
New Zealand	▼188,000	▼216,000	▲220,000	▲213,000	▲207,000	▲196,000	▼165,000	▼175,000	— 187,000
Thailand	▲184,000	▼93,000	▲94,000	▼77,000	▲79,000	▲76,000	▼74,000	▲75,000	▼65,000
Mexico	▲166,000	▼153,000	▲155,000	▲106,000	▲102,000	▼92,000	▲109,000	84,000	▲78,000
Luxembourg	▲146,000	▼76,000	▼83,000	▼104,000	▲122,000	▲97,000	▲90,000	▲83,000	73,000
Cyprus	▲128,000	▼96,000	▲163,000	▼135,000	▲136,000	▼119,000	▲123,000	▼111,000	▲124,000
Slovakia	▼113,000	▼142,000	▲179,000	▼156,000	▲175,000	▼132,000	▲146,000	▲120,000	▼117,000
Pakistan	▼90,000	▲102,000	▲69,000	▲66,000	▼58,000	▲75,000	▼63,000	▲73,000	65,000
Egypt	▲52,000	— 43,000	▲43,000	▼42,000	▼47,000	▲59,000	▲54,000	▲50,000	▼41,000
Morocco	▲33,000	▼32,000	– 33,000	▲33,000	▼29,000	▲35,000	▲31,000	▲26,000	▲19,000
Sri Lanka	▲29,000	▲20,000	▼17,000	▲22,000	▼16,000	▼17,000	▲24,000	— 20,000	▲20,000
Barbados	▲27,000	▲22,000	– 11,000	▼11,000	▲16,000	▼9,000	▲10,000	▼6,000	▲11,000
Tunisia	▲9,000	▼5,000	▼7,000	▼12,000	▲14,000	▼9,000	▲10,000	— 9,000	— 9,000
Jamaica	▼8,000	▲15,000	▲8,000	▼4,000	▲14,000	— 10,000	▲10,000	— 7,000	▼7,000
Total	▲40,857,000	▼37,905,000	▲39,214,000	▲37,609,000	▲36,115,000	▲34,377,000	▲32,692,000	▲31,084,000	▲30,798,000

== See also ==
- Visa policies of British Overseas Territories
- Common Travel Area
- Visa requirements for British citizens
- UK Electronic Travel Authorisation
