= Student migration =

Movement of students to study internationally

Student migration is the movement of students who study outside their country of birth or citizenship for a period of 12 months or more. During the period of globalization, the internationalisation of higher education increased dramatically and it has become a market driven activity. With the rapid rise of international education more and more students are seeking higher education in foreign countries and many international students now consider overseas study a stepping-stone to permanent residency within a country. The contributions that foreign students make to host nation economies, both culturally and financially has encouraged major players to implement further initiatives to facilitate the arrival and integration of overseas students, including substantial amendments to immigration and visa policies and procedures. Institutions are competing hard to attract international students at a time when immigration policies in leading destinations like the US and the UK are not enabling transition to work visas.

== History ==
During the colonial period, the majority of student flow came from colonies to the world capitals. Imperial governments provided pathways for selected nationals to pursue higher education. The concept of studying abroad was based on the assumption that graduates would return to their homeland to serve colonial administration once they had developed skills and absorbed the values of the colonial rulers.

The Cold War era had a significant impact on foreign aid and the funding of overseas students. The policy of distributing scientific knowledge and sharing industrial progress with the developing world required the help of higher education institutions. Support for USAID linked the foreign policy mission with support for higher education. Cold War rivals funded study abroad programs and were in competition to attract students from the developing world.

One of the most famous international exchange programs that facilitates and encourages international student migration is the Fulbright Program. Established in 1946, the Fulbright Program provides grants for students, scholars, teachers, and professionals to undertake studies and research. The Fulbright Program was initially funded by using proceeds from the sales of surplus war property and was founded on the principle of promoting "international goodwill through the exchange of students in the fields of education, culture and science".

The Colombo Plan was another program that encouraged the movement of students between countries. The Colombo Plan was established in 1951 with the intention of strengthening the economic and social development of the Asia Pacific region. The Colombo Plan has been responsible for sponsoring over 40,000 Asian students to study or train in Australian higher education institutions. Funding is provided by member countries, which includes a mixture of 26 Commonwealth and non-Commonwealth countries.

Since the colonial and Cold War eras, the profile of international students has made a significant shift. The way in which students travel has changed, and the majority of students seeking education abroad are now self-funded.

== Financing and cost ==
The international student market has become an important source of revenue for local economies and many institutions rely heavily on the income brought by cross-border students. Receiving countries could benefit from qualified skilled migrants who make considerable contributions to their new countries. International students are also demanding more "value for money" as finding job opportunities abroad is becoming more difficult.Recalibrating value for money for international students

In most host countries, higher education was tuition fee-free. Until the 1980s, many countries had not any provision for levying fees on domestic and international students. The UK was the first to introduce fees on overseas students; other countries, such as Australia, began to follow suit.

The international market for students now accounts for billions of dollars and, subsequently, competition between institutions is fierce. Studying abroad is expensive and in most cases is funded by the individual.

In OECD countries there are three patterns to the levying of fees:

1. In some countries fees for international students are higher than domestic students. This occurs in Australia, Canada, New Zealand, the UK and the USA. Sweden started levying fees for non-European students from 2011.
2. Some countries make no distinction between international and domestic student fees. Tuition fees remain the same for foreign and domestic students in France, Greece, Hungary, Italy and Japan.
3. Countries such as Denmark, Finland and Norway have not begun levying tuition fees from foreign students.

== Destination countries ==
Between 1963 and 2006 the number of students studying in a foreign country increased 9 times. In 2006 there were 2.7 million students studying abroad and there are predictions that the demand for cross-border education will increase to 7.2 million by 2025.

OECD countries receive approximately 85% of the world's foreign students with the majority concentrated in just 6 countries. In 2007, the United States accounted for 21.4% of foreign enrolments, the United Kingdom 12.6%, France 8.8%, Australia 7.6%, Germany 7.4%, and Japan 4.5%.

Australia has the highest ratio of international students per head of population in the world by a large margin, with 812,000 international students enrolled in the nation's universities and vocational institutions in 2019. Accordingly, in 2019, international students represented on average 26.7% of the student bodies of Australian universities. International education therefore represents one of the country's largest exports and has a pronounced influence on the country's demographics, with a significant proportion of international students remaining in Australia after graduation on various skill and employment visas.

Europe is also a major destination, with approximately 840,000 international students. However the majority of this figure comes from students moving from one European country to another.

East Asia and the Pacific top the list for sending students and accounts for 29% of all international higher education students. (Students from China account for 15% of this total.) North America and Western Europe account for 18%, then Central and East Europe 11%, South and West Asia 9%, Arab States 7% and Sub Saharan Africa 5.8%.

== Contributing factors to growth in student migration ==
There are many factors contributing to the growing numbers of student migration. Many developing countries have an under supply of university places to satisfy demand and as a result students have no other choice but to study abroad. In addition to this it is a common expectation that studying overseas can enhance professional business opportunities. Generally, students seeking cross-border education migrate to countries with more developed education institutions than their own. For example, students in Arab countries migrate to Egypt and Jordan to pursue their studies, and many students from Bangladesh and Nepal travel to India. The flow of students from developing countries to developed countries is often due to the belief that the quality and standards of education offered in OECD countries is superior to what is offered in the country of origin.

Higher education has become a major global export commodity with developing countries capitalising on domestic shortages by recruiting foreign students. Subsequently, changes to visa and immigration policies have provided incentives for students to travel abroad and potentially offer a gateway to permanent residency within a host nation. Migration opportunities are one of the major contributions to the growth of student migration. A 2006 survey, undertaken by Australia's Monash University, produced statistics which showed 75% of Indian students who completed university education in Australia applied for and were granted residency. The author of the research, Michiel Bass suggests that the most influential reason Indian students studied in Australia was not because of academic reputation, but the opportunity to gain permanent residency.

Other factors for the rise in student migration include lowering travel expenses and greater communication technology which has made studying abroad more accessible.

== Student visa and immigration policies ==
=== United States ===
The US attracts a large number of foreigners to its workforce each year, however international graduates of US institutions do not automatically have the right to remain in the country for work purposes upon completion of their course. In fact, as part of the student application process, applicants must state that they are not planning to emigrate to the US.

Visa and immigration policies in the US are (arguably) significantly less accommodating towards international students and graduates compared to other host countries. The greatest changes to visa regulations occurred after the attacks of September 11, 2001, when the US immediately implemented tougher visa and immigration requirements. Under the Enhanced Border Security and Visas Entry Reform Act (2002) the US introduced a new overseas student tax in order to fund an advanced computer tracking system for visa applications, but also made it more difficult for applicants to transfer between visa categories.

However, recently the US Department of State has established a new internship scheme which has been specifically designed for foreign students. Since July 2007, certain international students are eligible to participate in a year-long internship per degree level for practical training as long as they can describe how the experience can enhance their education.

=== United Kingdom ===
In 2006, as part of a larger scheme to attract highly skilled labour, the UK government made amendments to the Science and Engineering Graduate Scheme (SEGS) which enabled all international students who have completed a post-graduate degree course (Master's of PhD starting after 1 May 2006) to remain in the UK and seek employment for up to 12 months regardless of discipline. The Government has also made a special provision for internationally coveted Master of Business Administration (MBA) students, allowing graduates of 50 highly ranked business schools to apply for a three-year extension to their one-year working visa once their studies have been completed. As part of the Highly Skilled Migrant Programme (HSMP), such students have been eligible to apply for permanent residence since 12 April 2005. The Government further extended opportunities for non EU/EEA students in 2007, which allows all students who have completed degree programmes in the UK the opportunity to stay in the UK for employment purposes. The International Graduates Scheme has been in operation since 1 May 2007.

However, in March 2011, the UK Government made an announcement on reforming student visa system, which is getting much stricter The major changes in student immigration policies including tougher requirements for entrance, tightening work entitlements and closing the post-study work route are aimed at ensuring the UK welcomes the best overseas students with expected contribution.

=== Germany and France ===
Since January 2005, Germany has issued singular permits for both residence and employment in an effort to attract international students and skilled migrants to the country and facilitate their arrival. Overseas students are also eligible to apply for an extension on their residence permit for up to one year for the purpose of seeking employment which is relevant to their field of study upon completion of their studies.

In France, international students have the right to work part-time for up to 19 hours per week whilst studying. Students must, however, have a valid residency permit and be enrolled in an institution which participates in the French social protection system. Upon completion of studies, students are able to accept offers of employment from French firms by applying for temporary employment authorization. It ought to be noted that both Germany and France belongs to the Schengen agreement.

=== Australia ===
In addition to Australia's points system, which encourages skilled migration, regulations allow all international students completing an Australian degree to remain in the country for 18 months upon graduating. Students can earn bonus points for skilled work experience and English-language proficiency in addition to those already earned for Australian qualifications, under amendments to the General Skilled Migration Programme (GSM). Previously, international students were exempt from work experience requirements when applying for general skilled migration.

Legislation introduced on September 1, 2007, requires authorities to provide 'temporary visas' to enable applicants to earn experience. These changes were made to strengthen links between study, work experience and employment to ensure migrants have the skills that Australian employers are looking for. The main rationale behind these schemes is the desire for Australia to benefit from the skills of foreign graduates.

Students no longer have the option to remain in Australia following the completion of a master's degree for the purposes of work. It is now necessary to re-apply under specific sponsorship.

=== Canada ===
International students travelling to Canada are not required to apply for a study visa unless the programmes they are enrolled in are longer than 6 months. Acquiring a study permit, does however have significant benefits to students, giving them permission to seek part-time employment on campus and since April 2006, off campus, for up to 20 hours per week whilst they are completing their studies. Under the Post-Graduation Work Permit Programmes, international graduates from Canadian higher education institutions are eligible to apply for employment of up to two years.

In 2008, 105 780 study permits applied for from outside Canada were processed, and in 22% of those cases a study permit was refused. Refusal rates varied by region, with 11% of applicants from Europe refused and 35% from Africa and the Middle East refused.

=== New Zealand ===
In New Zealand, international students are not required to apply for a student visa if they are studying for a course which is less than three months in duration. Under certain circumstances international students can seek part-time employment for up to 20 hours per week whilst studying (full-time) in a course that at least 6 months in duration. In July 2007, amendments were made to the Skilled Migrant Category which gives students the opportunity to earn bonus points for recognized New Zealand higher education qualifications or for two years of full-time study in the country. In addition, the number of years to require points for work experience in New Zealand will be reduced and international students may be eligible to apply for a work visa for up to two year upon completion of their studies in the country.

== Issues that can arise with student migration ==
The loss of students from sending countries can have a rather detrimental impact on the economy by depleting already scarce resources. Brain drain is the large scale loss of individuals with technical skills or knowledge.

Differences in learning cultures is an issue in student migration. This means that the students can have difficulty if the teaching, learning and assessment methods are very different from those in their previous education. For example, some European students studying in Britain have been noted as having little experience of a number of tasks typically expected of British students while many are familiar "with only traditional forms of assessment such as examinations".

== See also ==
- Brain drain
- Colombo Plan
- Fulbright Program
- Immigration
- Immigration policy
- International student
- Student exchange
