= Reverse brain drain =

Movement of educated people to less developed countries

Reverse brain drain is a form of brain drain where human capital moves in reverse from a more developed country to a less developed country that is developing rapidly. These migrants may accumulate savings, also known as remittances, and develop skills overseas that can be used in their home country.

Brain drain can occur when scientists, engineers, or other intellectual elites migrate to a more developed country to learn in its universities, perform research, or gain working experience in areas where education and employment opportunities are limited in their home country. These professionals then return to their home country after several years of experience to start a related business, teach in a university, or work for a multi-national in their home country. Their return is this "Reverse Brain Drain".

The occurrence of reverse brain drain mostly depends on the state of the country's development, and also strategies and planning over a long period of time to reverse the migration. Countries that are attractive to returning intelligentsia will naturally develop migration policies to attract foreign academics, professionals and executives. This would also require these countries to develop an environment which will provide rewarding opportunities for those who have attained the knowledge and skills from overseas.

In the past, many of the immigrants from developing countries chose to work and live permanently in developed countries; however, the recent economic growth that has been occurring back in their home countries—and the difficulty of attaining long-term work visas—has caused many of the immigrants to return home.

== Definition ==
The term ‘reverse brain drain' is closely tied with brain drain and brain gain because reverse brain drain is a migratory phenomenon that results due to the brain drain of the intellectual elites from developing countries and is the mirror image of the benefit of an inflow of high quality human resources which is brain gain.

Reverse brain drain is sometimes related to the term ‘brain circulation', which is when migrants return to their own country on a regular or occasional basis, sharing the benefits of the skills and resources they have acquired while living and working abroad. An example of the benefits for the host countries, especially developing countries, are the payments of remittances. This provides a reason for governments to issue new legislation and tax rules that encourage outward migration and remittances.

However, "brain circulation" is known as the extended definition of brain gain with an emphasis on human capital circulation across nations in the global market, benefiting both the sending and receiving nations; in addition it is considered a two-way flow of skill, capital, and technology, unlike brain drain and reverse brain drain.

=== Another form ===
Recently there is a different type of reverse brain drain developing. This form of reverse brain drain differs from the way it is commonly viewed. It is explained by Salman Khurshid, the former Minister of State for Corporate and Minority Affairs in India. He states that "Many second-generation Indians are coming back to the country". Therefore, reverse brain drain is no longer limited to the commonly perceived migration from a developed to a developing country by a first generation individual. Many of the world's top multinational companies are beginning to send their top Indian minds to head their companies in India and have the idea of reverse brain drain which is, "So when we lose some, we win many back."

== Trends ==
Over the past decades, changes in socio economic, political and cultural factors in both developed and developing countries have influenced the movements of people across these countries. Traditionally, skilled individuals from developing countries migrate to developed countries for many reasons, such as political persecution and economic opportunity, creating a “brain drain”. However this pattern has started to shift over the years, with many individuals who would normally be willing to move to more developed countries for opportunities, contributing to the brain drain, deciding to stay in their home country or individuals from developing countries in developed countries choosing to return to their home countries.

=== Remigration of skilled workers from developed countries back to developing countries ===
The main driver of reverse brain drain is from educated and skilled foreign born workers from developing countries returning home due to various factors, such as political and social consideration, economic opportunities or even government initiatives.

Shifting politics in developed countries

The political and economic climate in several developed nations has shifted in ways that affect foreign-born professionals. Immigration policy debates have intensified in countries, though the US under Trump second term has seen the biggest change, with recent policy proposals emphasizing stricter immigration controls and, in some cases, encouraging remigration. In fact, the second term of the Trump administration has brought renewed focus on reducing immigration levels and tightening visa requirements for foreign workers. This has not only made immigration to the US undesirable for many, but even dangerous and trauma inducing in some cases, as seen during the 2025 Hyundai immigration raid incident. This pattern of rising anti immigration and anti foreign rhetoric is also true in traditionally attractive countries for skilled workers such as France, Germany and the UK, which saw a rise in far right parties like the National Rally, AFD, and Reform respectively.

This political and social instability and danger for immigration has made many foreign born citizens, especially highly skilled individuals like scientists, to consider remigration. This is especially true for certain nationalities such as Chinese and Indian immigrants. As US and China tensions rise due to trade conflicts alongside a cut to federal grants, there has been a steady increase of scientists of Chinese descent immigrating from the United States to China, even those with relatively stable economic status, such as those with tenured or tenure track positions.

==== Decline in economic opportunities in developed countries ====
Alongside these political shifts, economic factors have also played a role. Job market conditions for foreign-born professionals have become more challenging in certain sectors with increased competition and, in some cases, regulatory barriers that favor domestic workers. The newly established H1B fee under Trump is one example of such barriers. Another reason why job opportunities for foreign born has declined over the years in developed countries, is due to an overall decline in job opportunities in developed countries as a whole, and that the most affected sectors are usually those with a high percent of foreign employment, such as research, especially in the US with recent funding cuts, technology and healthcare.

Furthermore, the increasing cost of living in developed countries has also made these countries less desirable for many. Examples can be seen in the decline of affordable housing in countries like Canada, the inflationary residue of the Covid 19 pandemic or the rise in prices due to tariffs in the US. These combined factors have contributed to both a decline in new skilled worker immigration and an increase in return migration among those already established in developed countries.

==== Expanding opportunities in countries of origin ====
Simultaneously, as developed countries become less attractive for highly educated and skilled individuals, many developing nations have experienced substantial economic growth and investment in key industries, particularly in technology, finance, and manufacturing. This development, alongside government efforts to bring back their talent pool, have created a global reverse brain drain, especially in China, India and South East Asia. Countries such as India, China, Brazil, and several nations in Southeast Asia and Africa have developed robust business ecosystems that now compete with traditional destinations for talent.

Furthermore, due to their experience and knowledge in particular sectors, such as big tech and finance, the returnees are often equipped with sufficient skills to create new business opportunities in their home country and help grow a nascent domestic industry. This can be seen with the rise of “tech cities” in India, such as Hyderabad, in which most new startups and businesses were created by former Silicon valley Indian employees.

Government initiatives in these countries have also played a role, with many implementing policies specifically designed to attract returning nationals, though this varies country by country. These initiatives can be seen through direct approaches to attract returnees such as tax incentives or government empowerment, while others were less direct such as establishing attractive policies such as streamlined business registration processes, increased research funding, and programs that facilitate knowledge transfer from diaspora communities. South Korea can be seen using a combination of these approaches under president Park, in which the government provided tax incentives for returnees, but also invested in a government-sponsored R&D building, and made legal and administrative reforms towards social issues that may scare off potential returnees. The combination of economic dynamism and targeted policy interventions has made return migration increasingly attractive for skilled professionals. However, many developing countries still have a few disadvantages that make them less attractive to developed countries, mainly concerning social issues like minority rights, equality and working conditions, though this varies case by case.

== Reverse brain drain development by country ==
=== Asia ===
==== China ====
China has generally been seen as a developing country, and they have been impacted by brain drain through the migration of their talented minds to the developed world. What has assisted China in the flow of return migration are central government policies. These policies are changes in the domestic environment, the freedom to immigrate and emigrate freely, political stability, and changes in how the government uses people. In addition, the local government was involved in the enhancement of return migration by cities rewarding the returnees with large bonuses from their home unit. There are also other reasons which encouraged the migration back to the home country, which were higher social status in China, better career opportunities in China, and patriotism.

In addition, competition among universities, research laboratories and enterprises has given the returning intellectual elites excellent incentives. For example, in the new life science school at Beijing's Tsinghua University, they were able to recruit many Chinese scientists who were previously in more developed countries like the United States due to China's booming economy, large government investment in research, and the chance to build a science program from the ground up.

Besides the government policies and economic reasons for returning to China, certain family factors influenced the decision to return, some of the reasons where parental views about returning, concerns for children, and the attitude of one's spouse about returning.

==== India ====
India is one of the first countries where reverse brain drain occurred. Previously, India was well known as the country where numerous information technology students left for America for a better education and greater employment opportunities. The turning point was during the dot-com bubble, when many information technology experts were forced to return to India due to the slump and the loss of jobs in the United States.

Previously, the Indian Government had been unhappy about the brain drain. Tens of thousands of migrants went to the U.S. for graduate engineering education, and accepted jobs in Silicon Valley rather than return to their home countries, where professional opportunities were limited.

Besides the dot-com bubble crisis, the economic and employment opportunities in India encouraged many Indian entrepreneurs to promote economic development there, which encouraged intellectuals to return to India.

Many Indian high-skilled workers were also impelled to return to India by their desires to return to their roots, a more family-oriented lifestyle, and also security concerns in the post-9/11 period when Indians were discriminated against because they were often mistaken for Arabs.

Although many have returned, more have stayed. The Seattle Times estimates that 25% of all software developers in the US either are, or once were H1Bs, and Silicon Valley is now at 75% for the same statistic. This translates to more than two million Indians in Software Development, who are now permanent residents of the US along with their spouses and children, as 90% of H1Bs were Indian.

In a 2018 article The Seattle Times estimated that half of the software developers in Seattle were born overseas. The same applies in many other cities across the nation. Although there are claims of a shortage as the reason for the H1Bs, the total number of software developers in the US has grown only at around 2% to 4% per year, and many suspect that this brain drain from India to the US is championed by the US government.

==== Nepal ====
The Government of Nepal's Ministry of Foreign Affairs opened a Brain Gain Center in May 2019, with the explicit purposes of identifying successful Nepali diaspora experts and professionals around the world, promoting their expertise within the government, facilitating the connections between government officials and them.

==== Pakistan ====
After the September 11 attacks and the 2008 financial crisis, many expatriates forming the Pakistani diaspora throughout North America, and even Europe, began to return to Pakistan. Many of these returning expatriates tended to have excellent credentials and due to their professional and cultural background were able to easily assimilate and find new job opportunities in the country – contributing to an overall "reverse brain drain" effect. One notable example is the media boom in Pakistan which inspired and prompted many overseas Pakistanis working in the field of journalism to return to the country and take up readily available positions in the country's largest press groups and channels. Today, there are over 47,000 British nationals in Pakistan, many of whom are of Pakistani origin, who have returned to contribute to the economic development of the country.

==== South Korea ====
South Korea's reverse brain drain was different from the social phenomenon because it was based on an organized government effort with various policies and the political support of President Park Chung Hee. The main features of Korea's Reverse Brain Drain policies were the creation of a conducive domestic environment, and the empowerment of returnees.

Besides the policies, there are also cultural incentives for the intellectual elites to return home which was the desire to improve Korea's economic conditions and competitiveness, the cultural differences between Korea and America, and family-related responsibilities and concerns. Many of the students who migrated to the United States to study, especially the only son or the eldest of the family, felt obligated to return home to be with the family

==== Taiwan ====
Previously, Taiwan had experienced a loss of more than 80 percent of its students who had completed their graduate study in the United States, but the government of the Republic of China (ROC) responded to this to increase the return migration of the students. Some of the action taken by the authorities of the Republic of China were the setting up of the National Youth Commission (NYC), a cabinet-level government office, and other organizations to recruit Taiwan's scholars abroad and carry out related programs. In addition, Taiwan's official policy consists of two sections:

1. Improve and strengthen the institutions of higher learning at home
2. Encourage Taiwan's "brain" in the United States to remigrate and/or contribute their talents and knowledge to Taiwan's national development.

One reason behind the increased percentage of college students going abroad and the decline of returnees was due to Taiwan's political status and the severed diplomatic ties with the ROC government in 1979; however, the percentages of college students study abroad slowly started to increase after the political shock settle. The two most cited reasons for returning to Taiwan in 1983 were highly normative pride and strong identification with Taiwan's developmental goal and desire to be in it. Besides these reasons, there were other social and cultural reasons that were given by the returning migrants which were:

- Never thought of staying in the U.S.
- I have wife and children in Taiwan
- My parents wanted me to come home
- I was offered an ideal job in Taiwan
- I could not find an ideal spouse in the U.S.
- I was discriminated against in the U.S.
- I could not find a good job in the U.S.

=== Latin America ===
==== Mexico ====
The federal government of Mexico has been implementing public policies, were included in the Program for the Support of Science and Research, which were designed to internationalize the domestic academic market and had the objective to repatriate young Mexican scientists who have obtained a postgraduate degree abroad.

The result of the repatriation and retention of Mexican researchers from 1991 to 1996 and 2002 shows how there is a general increase of more Mexican researchers to return to Mexico and this can be viewed in the table below:

| | 1991 | 1992 | 1993 | 1994 | 1995 | 1996 | 2002 |
|---|---|---|---|---|---|---|---|
| Mexican Researchers^ | 96 | 257 | 160 | 267 | 174 | 195 | 172 |

^ Previously known as Repatriation and Retention

Although these policies have been assisting in the slow returning migration of young Mexican scientists, the policies should be broadened out and not focused exclusively on individual scientists, due to the positive outcomes that may result from repatriation.

=== Africa ===
In Africa, instead of the commonly termed ‘brain drain', the term ‘reverse transfer of technology' (RTT) is used to describe the migration of scientists from developing countries to overseas.

"There is a disconnect between Africans in the diaspora and on the continent. For example, there are inferiority and superiority complexes, and returnees tend to ignore the pain points of the environments they return to."

— Ade Olufeko, a technologist speaking about reverse brain drain challenges in 2017.

In order to prevent the loss of the experts, Africa has observed the "friends and relatives effect", which identifies professional, societal and personal factors as the three imperatives underlying the decision of African students in the United States to return home. In addition, the most widespread instrument used by African countries to combat the brain drain is bonding, which obligates a graduate to return home for a required period of time before s/he can emigrate or to also have bilateral agreements with developed countries, which will require them to return home immediately upon graduation. These approaches are influenced from the policies that exist and worked in Asian countries.

=== Eastern Europe ===
Eastern Europe have faced a growing brain drain problem since their integration with the developed countries of West Europe, as many of their talented youth would rather work in countries like Germany or France, than staying in their home countries, which has less opportunities and still faces many social issues such as corruption. This is exacerbated with the EU and Schengen zone, which facilitates movement between these countries. However, efforts have been made by Eastern European countries to reverse this trend. Countries like Romania has enacted return programs for skilled professionals and promoted brain networking organizations, though the success of these actions remain uncertain as many other factors, such as the lack of democratic development or welfare, still make Eastern European countries nitrative for potential returnees.

== Movement of skilled workers from developed to developing countries ==
=== The digital nomad phenomenon ===
Another important factor to include when analyzing reverse brain drain is the COVID-19 pandemic. This pandemic, which occurred during a time where communications technology was becoming more and more relevant, fundamentally altered perceptions of work and location. The rapid adoption of remote work technologies demonstrated that many professional roles could be performed effectively from anywhere with reliable internet connectivity. This realization has given rise to a growing cohort of "digital nomads", professionals who maintain employment or business relationships in developed economies while living in developing countries.

This trend has been facilitated by several factors. Many developing nations or even developed nations with lower living costs have introduced digital nomad visas and related immigration pathways designed to attract remote workers. These programs typically offer extended stay permits without requiring traditional employment within the host country. The appeal for these workers often includes lower costs of living, favorable exchange rates, desirable climates, and opportunities for cultural experience, all while maintaining career continuity and income levels. This has made regions such as South Asia, known for its tropical climate, tourism and low costs, into one of the primary hubs of digital nomad, with locations such as Thailand and Bali leading the charge.

The implications of this trend extend beyond individual lifestyle choices. Digital nomads contribute to local economies through consumption and, in some cases, through mentorship and knowledge sharing with local professionals. However, their presence has also raised concerns in some communities about housing affordability and cultural impacts. In cities like Mexico city, locals have protested against digital nomads, blaming them for rising living costs and housing, as the digital nomad’s salaries do not reflect local salaries and artificially increase prices.

== Associated problem for developed countries ==
The problem of a reverse brain drain is of particular concern in the United States of America, where not enough undergraduate students are seeking advanced degrees at the doctorate level. This leads to several consequences. Initially, it increases the widespread replacement of native-born with foreign born professionals and academics in the areas of greatest intellectual and economic interest to the developed country. This is a problem since foreign-born professional and academics from developing countries, such as China or India, are increasingly motivated to return to their home countries due to rapid economic growth, increasing living standards, and increasing opportunities in their home country. The reverse migration of the foreign-born professionals and academics leaves developed countries with a lack of intellectual capital. This may lead to economic drawbacks in developed countries and diminishing opportunities for native-born professionals. Statistics show that more than 52% of Silicon Valley's startups during the recent tech boom were started by foreign-born entrepreneurs. In addition, the "foreign-national researchers have contributed to more than 25% of our global patents… foreign-born workers comprise almost a quarter of all the U.S. science and engineering workforce and 47% of science and engineering workers who have PhDs." Furthermore, 54% of engineering doctorates went to foreign students, who returned to their home country after graduation, which disheartens the executives of research and development in the developed countries.

== See also ==
- International students
- Student migration
- Middleman minority
- Human capital flight
