= Work permit (United Kingdom) =

British skilled worker immigration scheme

UK Work Permit
- Type: Immigration route
- Country: United Kingdom
- Ministry: Home Office
- Introduced: Pre-2008 (Original scheme); 2020 (Skilled Worker route)
- Status: Superseded (Replaced by Skilled Worker visa)
- Related: Points-based immigration system (United Kingdom)

The UK Work Permit scheme was the primary immigration category used to encourage skilled workers to enter the United Kingdom until 2008. While the specific legal document known as a "Work Permit" was phased out, the term remains in colloquial use to refer to the sponsorship systems that replaced it: initially the Tier 2 (General) visa (2008–2020), and currently the Skilled Worker visa, which was introduced in December 2020 following Brexit.

Significant reforms were implemented in April 2024, including a substantial increase in the minimum salary threshold and the replacement of the Shortage Occupation List with the Immigration Salary List (ISL).

== Evolution of the System ==
=== Pre-2008: The Work Permit Scheme ===
Historically, the Work Permit arrangement allowed UK employers to recruit non-EEA nationals for specific vacancies. The permit was granted to a specific person for a specific role. Employers had to demonstrate that no resident worker was available, often through a Resident Labour Market Test (RLMT).

=== 2008–2020: Tier 2 (General) ===
In November 2008, the classic Work Permit was integrated into the points-based immigration system as Tier 2 (General). This system introduced the Certificate of Sponsorship (CoS), a digital record assigned by a licensed employer, which replaced the physical permit document.

=== 2020–Present: Skilled Worker Visa ===
On 1 December 2020, the Tier 2 (General) route was replaced by the Skilled Worker visa. This change ended the free movement of people between the UK and the EU, treating EU and non-EU citizens equally.

== Current Eligibility and Requirements ==
To qualify for a Skilled Worker visa (the modern equivalent of a work permit), an applicant must meet specific criteria:

- Sponsorship: Must have a valid "Certificate of Sponsorship" (CoS) from a UK employer licensed by the Home Office.
- Job Level: The job must be at RQF Level 3 (A-level equivalent) or higher.
- English Language: Must prove English language proficiency (usually level B1 on the CEFR scale).
- Salary Threshold (2024 Update): As of April 2024, the general minimum salary threshold for new applicants rose significantly to £38,700 per year, or the "going rate" for the specific occupation, whichever is higher. Exceptions exist for Health and Care workers and those on national pay scales.

== Key Features ==
=== Immigration Salary List (ISL) ===
In April 2024, the Shortage Occupation List (SOL) was abolished and replaced by the Immigration Salary List (ISL). Jobs on the ISL are roles where the government acknowledges a critical lack of domestic workers. While employers can pay a lower salary threshold for these roles (typically 20% less than the general threshold), the "going rate" requirement must still be met.

=== Health and Care Worker Visa ===
A subset of the skilled route, the Health and Care Worker visa, is designed for medical professionals, social care workers, and doctors. Applicants for this visa benefit from:

- Lower visa application fees.
- Exemption from the Immigration Health Surcharge (IHS).
- Exemption from the £38,700 salary threshold increase (maintaining a lower baseline salary requirement).

=== Dependants ===
Skilled Worker visa holders can bring their partner and children as dependants. Dependants generally have the right to work in the UK (with limited exceptions). However, as of early 2024, care workers and senior care workers are no longer permitted to bring dependants.

== See also ==
- Visa policy of the United Kingdom
- Indefinite Leave to Remain
- UK Visas and Immigration
- Right to work in the United Kingdom
