= Immigration policy of the United Kingdom =

British Immigration Policy

Immigration policies of the United Kingdom are the areas of modern British policy concerned with the immigration system of the United Kingdom—primarily, who has the right to visit or stay in the UK. British immigration policy is under the purview of UK Visas and Immigration.

With its withdrawal from the European Union, the UK implemented a broad reform to its immigration system, putting an end to free movement with the EU and introducing a points-based immigration system on 1 January 2021.

In 2019, Prime Minister Boris Johnson pledged to reduce net migration to the UK (the number of people immigrating minus the number emigrating) below 250,000 per year. However, immigration to the UK rose following the introduction of the post-Brexit points-based immigration system on 1 January 2021.

Long-term net migration is estimated to have reached a record high of 944,000 in the year ending (YE) March 2023, with immigration at 1,469,000 and emigration at 525,000.

However, the Office for National statistics cautions against directly comparing figures from before and after July 2021, owning to a change in methodology for how net migration is calculated.

The Office for National Statistics' provisional estimate, released in November 2025 on migration in the year ending (YE) June 2025, stated that long-term net migration in the year ending (YE) June 2025 was 204,000: non-EU+ nationals at 383,000 net migration, British nationals at -109,000, and EU+ nationals at -70,000.

For the year ending (YE) June 2025, total immigration was 898,000: non-EU+ nationals accounted for 75% of total immigration (670,000), British nationals comprised 16% (143,000), and EU+ nationals constituted 9% (85,000).

For the year ending (YE) June 2025, total emigration was 693,000: non-EU+ nationals accounted for 41% of total emigration (286,000), British nationals composed 36% (252,000), and EU+ nationals accounted for 22% (155,000).

For the year ending (YE) June 2025, the top three nationalities from non-EU+ countries immigrating on work-related visas were Indian, Pakistani, and Nigerian.

== Electronic documentation ==
In the wake of Brexit, the British Government introduced a wide, multi-year programme of change, led by the Home Office, to transform the operation of the UK's border and immigration system. Following the first phase of this initiative which will take place in 2021, further improvements to the system in the longer term include the introduction of an Electronic Travel Authorisation system. The UK electronic travel authorisation (ETA) is planned as an electronic system that will be used to pre-check migrants travelling to the UK.

Citizens of Kuwait, Oman, Qatar, and United Arab Emirates in the Arabian peninsula can obtain an Electronic Visa Waiver (EVW) online to enter the United Kingdom, which is only valid for one entry each. An EVW authorisation enables its holder to visit and/or study in the UK for up to 6 months without a visa, and must be obtained each time an eligible person wishes to enter/re-enter the UK for such purpose. An EVW is only valid for one entry, and a new EVW must be obtained each time an eligible person wishes to enter the UK to visit and/or study for up to 6 months without a visa. The EVW is also valid for visits to Ireland for up to 90 days once a holder has cleared immigration in the United Kingdom.

== Points-based system and sponsorship ==
Since 2002, a points based scheme was introduced, and it has been revised several times. Exiting the European Union on 31 January 2020, the United Kingdom moved to end free movement and introduce an Immigration Bill with a different points-based system. This meant a single immigration policy applied to anyone who wishes to live and work in the UK. This would be the first phase of a wider multi-year programme of change, led by the Home Office, to transform the operation of the British border and immigration system—including sponsorship.

Under the new system, people require 70 points to enable them to work in the UK. These are made up of 50 Mandatory Points and 20 Tradeable Points, to work in the UK.

Current requirements
Requirement	Tradable with other requirements	Points
Offer of employment by an approved sponsor	No	20
Employment at the appropriate skill level	No	20
Speaks English at a sufficient level	No	10
Salary between £20,480 and £23,039	Yes	0
Salary between £23,040 and £25,599	Yes	10
Salary that is £25,600 or above	Yes	20
Employment in an occupation that has a shortage as designated by the Migration Advisory Committee	Yes	20
Education qualification: PhD in a subject relevant to the employment	Yes	10
Education qualification: PhD in a STEM subject relevant to the employment	Yes	20

=== Sponsorship ===
In order to be eligible to apply under certain categories of the points-based system, the applicant must have a sponsor which is on the UKBA register of sponsors. The register of sponsors lists all organisations that the UK Border Agency has licensed to employ migrant workers or sponsor migrant students. On 31 March 2009, the register of sponsors replaced the register of education and training providers published by the Department for Innovation, Universities and Skills (and previously by the Department for Education and Skills). During 2018, many NHS trusts found that applications for certificates of sponsorship for doctors and nurses were refused, leaving them to rely on locum staff.

Licences can only be applied for if:

- The potential sponsor is a legitimate organisation working within the law in the UK;
- There are no reasons to believe that the potential sponsor is a threat to immigration control; and
- the organisation will meet its sponsorship duties.

These criteria are to ensure that those working or studying in the UK do so legally. If the potential sponsor is awarded a sponsor licence, they will be given a sponsor rating - this will be an 'A rating' or a 'B rating', and will be listed on the register. Instead of an A or B rating, Tier 4 (General) sponsors could apply for a Highly Trusted sponsor licence.

For employers sponsoring skilled migrants under the new 2021 system, the visa process would be streamlined to reduce the time it takes to bring a migrant into the UK by up to 8 weeks. The Government intends to further reduce this through additional enhancements to the system.

== Visas ==
British Visas, as of April 2015
Visa	Details
Visitor Visas	Standard Visitor visa: As of April 2015, the Standard Visitor visa replaced the Family Visitor visa, General Visitor visa, Child Visitor visa, Business Visitor visa(including visas for academics, doctors, and dentists), Sports Visitor visa, Entertainer Visitor visa, Prospective Entrepreneur visa, Private Medical Treatment Visitor visa, and the Approved Destination Status (ADS) visa.; Marriage Visitor visa; Permitted Paid Engagement visa; Parent of a Tier 4 child visa; Visa to pass through the UK in transit; Direct Airside Transit visa; Visitor in Transit visa
Work Visas	Tier 1 visa; Entrepreneur (minimum £200,000 investment or £50,000 if qualified); Exceptional Talent (recognised leader in fields of science, humanities, engineering, medicine, digital technology or the arts); General (highly skilled workers, writers, composers or artists and self-employed lawyers); Graduate Entrepreneur; Investor (minimum £2,000,000 investment); Tier 2 visa (sponsored workers); General; Intra-company Transfer (foreign company workers in a British branch); Minister of Religion; Sportsperson; Tier 5 visa (temporary work for sponsored workers); Charity Worker (unpaid voluntary work); Creative and sporting; Government Authorised Exchange; International Agreement; Religious Worker; Youth Mobility Scheme; Domestic Workers in a Private Household visa (cleaners, chauffeurs, cooks, personal care providers and nannies); Representative of an Overseas Business visa (head of a British branch or a foreign journalist on a long-term posting); Turkish Businessperson visa; Turkish Worker visa; UK Ancestry visa (Commonwealth citizens with British born parents or grandparents); Croatian national registration certificates
Student Visas	Short-term study visa; Tier 4 visa; General; Child

=== Workers Visas ===
The scheme was phased in between 2008 and 2010. It is composed of five "tiers" which replaced all the previous work permits and entry schemes, including Scotland's Fresh Talent Initiative. The system was administered by the UK Border Agency the predecessor of UK Visas and Immigration.

==== Tier 1 (Entrepreneur) and Tier 1 (Graduate Entrepreneur) ====
This category is intended for entrepreneurs who want to set up or take over an existing business (or businesses) in the UK. This route requires entrepreneurs to be actively involved in running of their businesses either as company directors or as self-employed. Entrepreneurs are allowed to be employed and work only in the businesses they are involved with.

Successful applicants are granted with three years of initial leave to remain and those applying must have access to at least £200,000. Under certain circumstances, the applicants can apply if they have access to only £50,000. The funds can be shared by up to two people where they can apply as an entrepreneurial team. The initial leave will be further extended by two years if the applicants demonstrate that they have invested the funds in their business (or businesses) and created at least two full-time positions that existed for at least 12 months during the three-year initial period.

To prevent abuse of the route, all the applicants are subject to a Genuine Entrepreneur Test in which they must demonstrate the credibility and genuineness of their business (or businesses). In some cases, the applicants could be interviewed or asked to submit extra evidence.

After 5 years of leave on Tier 1 Entrepreneur, the applicants could potentially apply for Indefinite Leave to Remain (ILR) in the UK. The route allows the most successful entrepreneurs to apply for settlement within the first three-year under the Accelerated Route if they demonstrate that their business generated a turnover of at least £5m or created 10 full-time jobs for 10 people lasting 12 months or more.

International students are no longer able to apply for Tier 1 (Entrepreneur) route within the UK. Instead a separate route under Tier 1 (Graduate Entrepreneur) exists in which international graduates who have been officially endorsed by either the Department for International Trade (DIT) or a British higher education institution (HEI) can apply to remain in the UK to pursue their business ventures.

On 7 March 2019, the government published immigration rule changes to close the Tier 1 (Entrepreneur) and Tier 1 (Graduate Entrepreneur) routes to initial applications on 6 April 2019 and 6 July 2019 respectively. These two routes will be replaced by two new visa categories namely 'Start-up' and 'Innovator' visas.

==== Tier 1 (Investor) ====
The Investor subcategory is for those who wish to invest capital in the United Kingdom. In November 2014 the investment thresholds were increased to £2,000,000, £5,000,000 or £10,000,000. The difference between the thresholds is the amount of time it takes a migrant to be eligible for Indefinite Leave to Remain. With the £2,000,000 threshold it is 5 years, with the £5,000,000 threshold it is 3 years and with the £10,000,000 threshold it is 2 years. The funds must be invested in either share capital in British companies or in British bonds.

==== Tier 1 (Exceptional Talent) ====
The Exceptional Talent sub-category is for those who are recognised or have potential to be recognized as exceptionally talented leaders in the fields of science, the humanities, engineering, medicine, digital technology or the arts. This visa is issued for an initial maximum period of five years and four months.

==== Skilled worker ====
The Skilled Worker route is for those offered a job by a UK employer that meets minimum levels or salary and skill.

Skilled worker was introduced on 1 January 2021 to replace the previous Tier 2 General route which had been in place since November 2008. Tier 2 had itself replaced the provisions for work permit employment, ministers of religion; airport-based operational ground staff, overseas qualified nurse or midwife, seafarers, named researchers, agency employees, and overseas representatives (news media).

Compared to Tier 2 General, Skilled worker has some important change:

- Removal of Annual Cap
- Lowering education qualification levels to RQF 3
- Lowering of salary thresholds for New Entrants to UK Labour Market and those who will be employed in Jobs listed on Shortage Occupation List.
- Permitting switching from Tier 2 Intra Company Transfer to Skilled Worker Visa

=== Tier 5 ===
Tier 5 began in November 2008 and covers temporary workers and youth mobility. It replaced the previous schemes of Working Holidaymaker, au pairs, BUNAC, the Gap Year entrants concession, the Japan: Youth Exchange Scheme and the concession for research assistants to MPs.

This category comprises five sub-categories and the Youth Mobility scheme. The sub-categories are: Temporary workers – International Agreement; Temporary Workers – Charity Workers; Temporary Workers – Creative and Sporting; Temporary Workers – Religious Workers; and Temporary Workers – Government Authorised Exchange. Of the general requirements for all of these sub-categories, a major requirement is that individuals are able to come to the UK for a maximum of 12 months (except for the Youth Mobility and International Agreement Schemes where successful applicants will get 24 months) in order to seek temporary and short-term work, after which they will be expected to leave. Applicants under all Tier 5 sub-categories need to score 30 points for a valid certificate of sponsorship from a licensed UK employer (except the Youth Mobility Scheme), and 10 points for maintenance (having enough funds to support themselves in the UK) – currently this is £800.

However, before a person can apply under this category they will need a valid certificate of sponsor, which can only be issued by a sponsor who is registered with the UK Border Agency.

== Graduate Route for international students ==
This route is for those who complete a UK degree or other eligible qualification to work in the UK for up to 2 years. During this time they can secure longer-term employment and switch to another route that allows this.

A Science and Engineering Graduate Scheme was first introduced in 2004 especially to allow STEM graduates to remain in the UK for one year's work experience. Over time the visa opened to graduates of all subjects as the International Graduate Scheme, the Tier 1 (Post Study Work) allowed all graduates of any discipline and any degree class to remain in the UK for up to two years in order to search for work with no restrictions on its skill level.

In 2011 the Home Secretary Theresa May announced that, from April 2012, the Tier 1 (Post Study Work) visa was to be closed on the grounds that the arrangement was "far too generous" and that 39,000 students and their 8,000 dependants took up the visa "at a time when one in ten UK graduates were unemployed." The route was eventually closed to all applicants on 6 April 2012.

In February 2016, the UK parliament's Scottish affairs committee published an inquiry on the impacts of the closure of Tier 1 (Post Study Work) route on Scottish universities. The committee observed that the number of non-EU graduates moving on to work visas in Scotland after their studies has declined by 80% since 2012, and it argued that expanded post-study work rights for international students in Scotland should be reinstated. The British government formally replied on 19 October 2016 and rejected the committee's proposals. The government argued that the existing visa options are sufficient for international students in Scotland, and noted that, "Applying different immigration rules to different parts of the UK would complicate the immigration system, harming its integrity, and cause difficulties for employers with a presence in more than one part of the UK."

On 11 September 2019, eight years after it was originally cancelled by then Home Secretary Theresa May, the UK government announced its plans to reintroduce the two-year post study work visa as the new “Graduate Route” for international students.

On 14 October 2019, the UK Home Office confirmed that graduates of the country's higher education institutions will be eligible for the two-year Graduate Route visa from summer 2021.

In June 2020, during the COVID-19 pandemic, the UK Home Office confirmed that international students forced to continue their studies through distance or blended learning would remain eligible for the Graduate Route post study work visas in 2021 upon graduation, provided they “enter the UK before 6 April 2021 and complete the final semester of their studies in the UK”.

In July 2020, the UK Department for Business, Energy and Industrial Strategy revealed that international students who complete a PhD from Summer 2021 can stay in the UK for 3 years after study to live and work with the Graduate Route visa, as opposed to 2 years for undergraduate and postgraduate students. The UK Home Office also confirmed that dependants of postgraduate international students with a Graduate Route post study work visa from 2021 will retain leave to remain and the right to work in the UK provided they were in the country with them during the international student's postgraduate studies.

=== High Potential Individual Visa ===
From 30 May 2022, a new visa was introduced for graduates from non-British universities which feature in the top 50 of two of the three main international university rankings: Academic Ranking of World Universities, QS World University Rankings, and Times Higher Education World University Rankings. The visa follows similar terms to the post-study visa option available to graduates from British universities with eligible graduates given a 2-year work visa (3-year for those with a PhD).

Graduates who have received a qualification from the following institutions between November 2022 and October 2023 in the past 5 years are eligible:

(United States) Universities
University	State
California Institute of Technology	California
Columbia University	New York
Cornell University	New York
Duke University	North Carolina
Harvard University	Massachusetts
Johns Hopkins University	Maryland
Massachusetts Institute of Technology	Massachusetts
New York University	New York
Northwestern University	Illinois
Princeton University	New Jersey
Stanford University	California
University of California, Berkeley	California
University of California, Los Angeles	California
University of California, San Diego	California
University of Chicago	Illinois
University of Illinois at Urbana-Champaign	Illinois
University of Michigan-Ann Arbor	Michigan
University of Pennsylvania	Pennsylvania
University of Texas at Austin	Texas
University of Washington	Washington
Yale University	Connecticut

(Australia) (Canada) (China) (France) (Germany) (Hong Kong) (Japan) (Singapore) (Switzerland) Universities
University	Country
Chinese University of Hong Kong	Hong Kong
Ecole Polytechnique Fédérale de Lausanne	Switzerland
ETH Zurich	Switzerland
Karolinska Institute	Sweden
Kyoto University	Japan
McGill University	Canada
Nanyang Technological University	Singapore
National University of Singapore	Singapore
Paris Sciences et Lettres University	France
Peking University	China
Technical University of Munich	Germany
Tsinghua University	China
University of British Columbia	Canada
University of Hong Kong	Hong Kong
University of Melbourne	Australia
University of Queensland	Australia
University of Tokyo	Japan
University of Toronto	Canada
Zhejiang University	China

== History ==
=== Reception ===
In 2008, one of the justifications for the move to a new immigration system was the perceived need to restore public trust in immigration law and controls. During its introduction, the system was criticised by the then opposition Conservative Party because it lacks an overall cap on the number of people who can qualify under the points criteria. There have also been concerns that, in failing to provide for the possibility of low-skilled migration from outside of the EEA, the system might cause skills shortages in sectors such as the construction industry in the run-up to the 2012 Summer Olympics in London.

The system was criticised by the NHS Employers Organisation because NHS trusts faced a staffing crisis because plans to recruit more Filipino nurses were frustrated by the points-based immigration system. 85 applications by Newcastle upon Tyne Hospitals NHS Foundation Trust for tier 2 certificates of sponsorship were rejected between June and September 2015. The organisation wrote on behalf of the Trust, and nine others similarly placed, to the Home Secretary, Theresa May complaining that about 1000 applications had been rejected in six months, and anticipating that a further thousand would also be rejected. The Home Office responded by saying that over 1,400 tier 2 certificates of sponsorship had been issued to nurses since April 2015, but 600 had been 'returned unused.' Nurses were removed from the Shortage Occupation List on 6 April 2015, and the pay of most nurses is not sufficient to gain priority under the points based system.

=== Tiers not in use ===
==== Tier 1 (General) ====
The Home Secretary announced on 23 November 2010 that the Tier 1 General route will be closed. As of 23 December 2010, Tier 1 (General) was closed for overseas applications. Tier 1 (General) closed for applications in the UK (i.e. completely) on 6 April 2011. There were transitional arrangements for applications undecided by 6 April 2011.

Tier 1 (General) applied to highly skilled potential migrants looking for a job or wishing to become self-employed in the UK, and replaced the Highly Skilled Migrant Programme (HSMP). Applicants to Tier 1 (General) are awarded points for attributes including age, previous or prospective salary and qualifications. Applicants must have scored at least 75 or 80 points (depending on the time of their initial application) for primary attributes and 10 points each for English language and had the necessary funds to ensure maintenance in the UK. Applicants did not need to have a formal job offer made by a licensed UK employer in order to apply under this category.

This is an obsolete immigration route. Under the scheme, students who have successfully completed a degree at a UK institution could apply for permission to work in the UK for two years without needing a work permit. Holders of postgraduate certificates and postgraduate diplomas were originally eligible to apply, but these qualifications were removed from the eligibility in April 2009.

The Post Study Work scheme combined the previous one-year International Graduates Scheme (IGS) and two-year Fresh Talent - Working in Scotland Scheme (FTWiSS) into a single UK-wide two-year work scheme. Those already working under the IGS could have switched into the new scheme for a maximum total leave of 24 months. The UK Border Agency described Tier 1 (Post Study Work) as "a bridge to highly skilled or skilled work. People with Post Study Work leave are expected to switch into another part of the points system as soon as they are able to do so". The route was closed to all extension applicants on 6 April 2015 and subsequently fully closed to all applicants (including settlement) on 6 April 2018.

==== Tier 3 ====
(Never used) Tier 3 was originally designed for low-skilled workers filling specific temporary labour shortages, however it is currently suspended by the UK Government. A strong supply of labour from the European Economic Area (EEA), members of which do not require visas to work in the UK, has meant it has never been required since the points-based system was implemented in 2008.

=== Tier 4 ===
Tier 4 Student Visas were replaced by New Student Route under new PBI from 2021.

All student visas were classed under Tier 4 of the points-based system. To qualify, visa applicants must have already been offered a position at an educational institution which is licensed to sponsor migrants. The duration of Tier 4 visas varies, taking into account the time needed to conclude studies (but not necessarily attend a graduation ceremony). Some additional time is provided after the course ends to enable the student to receive results and make a decision on whether to use those to make an additional application for further leave to remain, but the additional time may or may not be sufficient to cover graduation. New restrictions were implemented on 6 April 2012.

== See also ==
- United Kingdom immigration law
- Visa policy of the United Kingdom
- Modern immigration to the United Kingdom
- UK Electronic Travel Authorisation
