= British protected person =

Class of British nationality

A British protected person (BPP) is a member of a class under British nationality law associated with former British protectorates, protected states, and territorial League of Nations mandates and United Nations trust territories which were under British control. Individuals with this status are British nationals, but are neither British nor Commonwealth citizens. Nationals of this class are subject to immigration controls when entering the United Kingdom and do not have the automatic right of abode there.

This status was created to accommodate residents of areas that were under British protection or administration but were not British possessions (as colonies were) or Dominions of the Crown. As of 2025, about 1,100 British protected persons hold valid British passports with this status and enjoy consular protection when travelling abroad. Most BPPs lost the status on the end of the British protection of their homeland, or on gaining the citizenship of some other country. Those who are still only BPPs are effectively stateless and are not guaranteed the right to enter the country by which they are protected.

== Background ==
Parts of the British Empire were not annexed as Crown possessions; instead, they were considered to be foreign soil under British suzerainty, and many had their own rulers. These included protectorates, protected states, League of Nations mandates, and United Nations trust territories. Because they were foreign territory, birth in one of these areas did not automatically confer British subject status. Instead, most people associated with them were designated as British protected persons.

In the 19th century, the term referred to any member of the native populations of the protectorates, or to a subject of the protected state rulers. Over time, it became a substantial form of nationality. Eligibility requirements for the status were initially not well defined. The designation was given to anyone who was considered to owe allegiance to a local ruler of a state under British protection or who was indigenous to a protectorate without local government. More substantial requirements were codified in 1934; individuals born in protected territories who had no other nationality at birth, or those born abroad who would otherwise be stateless to a BPP father, who was himself born in a protected territory, became British protected persons. The status was granted solely by royal prerogative until it was first defined in statute law in the British Nationality Act 1948. As Britain withdrew from its remaining overseas protectorates during decolonisation, some protected persons remained BPPs, despite the independence of their territories. In 1978, after almost all protected territories had become fully independent, the Parliament of the United Kingdom severely restricted the acquisition of BPP status.

The several types of protected territories were differentiated by how their administrative structures were established:

- Protected states were territories that had existing organised internal governments and exercised high degrees of autonomy in local governance. Britain was responsible only for their external affairs. Subjects of the rulers of these protected states were given BPP status. Former protected states in 1949 that were granted statutory BPP status include: Brunei, the Canton and Enderbury Islands, nine Malay states (Johor, Kedah, Kelantan, Negeri Sembilan, Pahang, Perak, Perlis, Selangor, Terengganu), the Maldives, the New Hebrides, the Trucial States, and Tonga.
- Most former protectorates had no pre-existing government and were territories where the British had administrative jurisdiction as well as control over their foreign affairs and defence. There was little distinction between a colony and such a protectorate, except that protectorates were not formally under British sovereignty. Former protectorates in 1949 include: Aden, Bechuanaland, Gambia, the Gold Coast, Kenya, Nigeria, Northern Rhodesia, Nyasaland, Sierra Leone, the Solomon Islands, Somaliland, Swaziland, Uganda, and Zanzibar.
- League of Nations mandates were territories held under custodianship granted to the United Kingdom after the First World War. United Nations trust territories were those mandated territories that continued to be held under British control after the Second World War. Because the areas that became trust territories did not have internal nationality laws, those regions were treated as if they were protectorates for nationality purposes. Former trust territories in 1949 include: Cameroons, Tanganyika, and Togoland.

== Acquisition and loss ==
Countries entirely or partially composed of former protectorates and trust territories that current British protected persons may originate from (includes the British Solomon Islands in the Pacific Ocean, east of Papua New Guinea)

Becoming a British protected person is effectively no longer possible. Registration as a BPP is currently only permitted for individuals who have always been stateless and were born to at least one BPP parent in the United Kingdom or an overseas territory. Prior to decolonisation, individuals born in a protected territory who held no other nationality at birth were British protected persons. The status was transferable by descent to children of BPP fathers (but not mothers) who did not have any other nationality following the full independence of their territories until 16 August 1978. BPP status was granted in addition to other British nationality classes; an individual can be both a British citizen and a British protected person.

Retaining BPP status after the end of British jurisdiction over a protected territory is dependent on the type of territory it was. Persons connected with former protectorates or trust territories may remain BPPs if they did not acquire citizenship of the relevant countries, while all who were associated with former protected states or mandated territories automatically had the status revoked on independence. For those associated with the British Solomon Islands, BPP retention has the added requirement of never having possessed any other nationality. Additionally, Citizens of the United Kingdom and Colonies who were solely connected with that protectorate lost CUKC status on independence and became BPPs instead.

British protected person status is automatically lost if an individual acquires any other nationality or citizenship after 16 August 1978, including other British nationality classes. It can also be voluntarily relinquished by a declaration made to the Home Secretary, provided that an individual already possesses or intends to acquire another nationality. BPP status may be deprived if it was fraudulently acquired. There is no path to restore BPP status once lost.

== Rights and privileges ==
British protected persons are exempted from obtaining a visa or entry certificate when visiting the United Kingdom for less than six months. When travelling in other countries, they may seek British consular protection. BPPs are also eligible to serve in non-reserved Civil Service posts and enlist in the British Armed Forces.

BPPs may become British citizens by registration, rather than naturalisation, after residing in the United Kingdom for more than five years and possessing indefinite leave to remain for more than one year. Registration confers citizenship otherwise than by descent, meaning that children born outside of the UK to those successfully registered will be British citizens by descent. Individuals who become British citizens automatically lose their BPP status. BPPs who do not hold and have not lost any other nationality on or after 4 July 2002 are entitled to register as British citizens.

== Restrictions ==
BPPs who hold no other nationality are de facto stateless because they do not have a right to enter the country that claims them as nationals. The Nationality, Immigration and Asylum Act 2002 allowed these individuals to register as British citizens, after which statelessness was generally resolved for people who were solely BPPs.

=== United Kingdom ===
Unlike members of other British nationality classes, British protected persons are not Commonwealth citizens. BPPs are subject to immigration control and have neither the right of abode nor the right to work in the United Kingdom. They are required to pay a "health surcharge" to access National Health Service benefits when residing in the UK for longer than six months. They do not have the right to vote in UK elections and are ineligible to stand for election to the House of Commons and local government. They are additionally barred from being sitting members in the House of Lords.

=== European Union ===
Before the United Kingdom withdrew from the European Union on 31 January 2020, full British citizens were European Union citizens. British protected persons have never been EU citizens and do not enjoy freedom of movement in other EU countries. They were, and continue to be, exempted from obtaining visas when visiting the Schengen Area.
