= British emergency passport =

Travel document issued by British diplomatic posts for the purpose of urgent travel

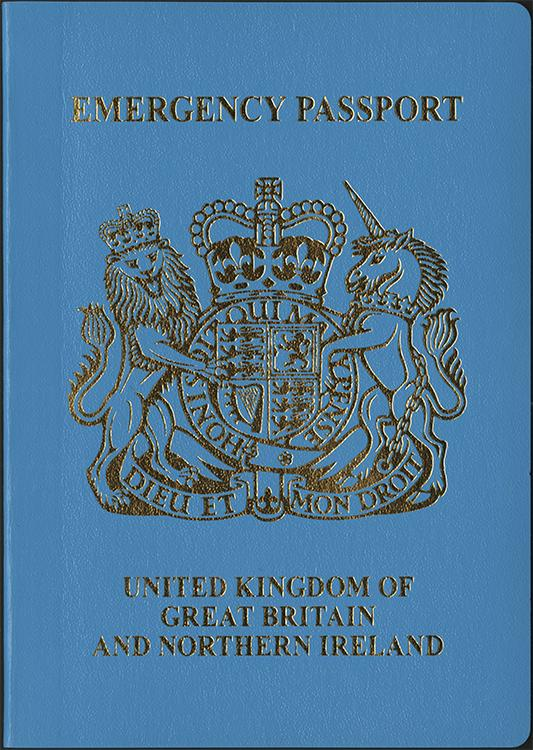
- The front cover of a Series C British emergency passport
- Type: Passport
- Issued by: United Kingdom
- Purpose: Identification
- Eligibility: British nationals and unrepresented Commonwealth citizens
- Expiration: 9 months maximum

British emergency passports (also known as Emergency Travel Documents (ETD)) are issued by British diplomatic posts to British nationals and unrepresented Commonwealth citizens for the purpose of urgent travel overseas with a maximum validity of nine months.

== Eligibility ==
British nationals, as well as unrepresented Commonwealth citizens, who need to travel urgently and whose passport has expired, been lost or been stolen can be issued with a British emergency passport by a British foreign mission. However, for a British emergency passport to be issued to a non-British Commonwealth citizen, permission must first be obtained from the individual's home government.

== Physical appearance ==
The following information appears on the biodata page:

- Photograph of the holder (digital image printed on page)
- Type (P)
- Code of Issuing State (GBR)
- Passport number
- Surname
- Given Names
- Nationality (the class of British nationality, such as "BRITISH CITIZEN" or "BRITISH OVERSEAS CITIZEN", or if issued on behalf of a Commonwealth country, "COMMONWEALTH CITIZEN")
- Date of birth
- Sex
- Place of birth (Only the city or town is listed, even if born outside the UK; places of birth in Wales are entered in Welsh upon request)
- Date of issue
- Authority (FCDO)
- Date of expiry
- Holder's signature (digital image printed on page)
- Machine Readable Zone starting with PGBR

== Use ==
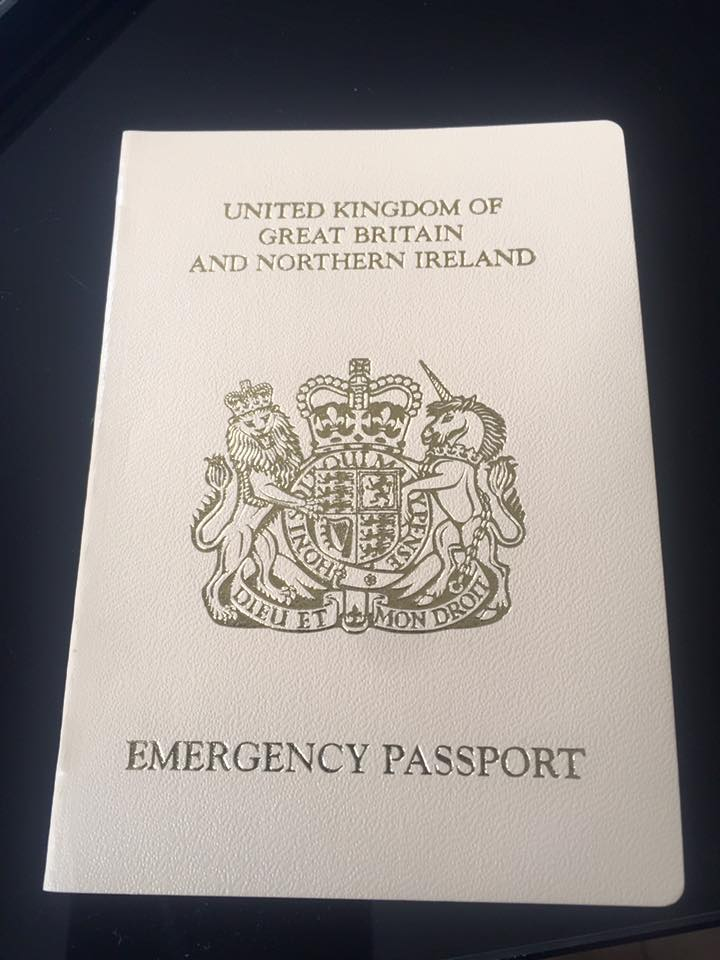
British emergency passport with cream cover, issued before 2020

The emergency passport can be used to make a single or return journey to the UK or another country of residence, via a maximum of five transit countries.

The emergency passport is issued with a validity which is limited to the shortest time appropriate to the holder's travel requirements whilst taking account of the transit and destination country requirements (for example, many countries require travel documents to have a minimum validity of six months).

== Providing an itinerary ==
The Foreign, Commonwealth and Development Office (FCDO) state that on applying for an Emergency Travel Document "You will be asked to provide an itinerary for your journey". However 'providing an itinerary' is not the same as 'booking a ticket' and if a passport has been reported lost or stolen using LS01 the applicant will have completed a declaration "I understand that completing and returning this form will result in the related passport being cancelled, that it may never be used again" which would appear to indicate that the number of the lost/stolen passport cannot be used to book any tickets.

== See also ==
- Canada–Australia Consular Services Sharing Agreement
