= Commonwealth citizen =

Citizen of a Commonwealth of Nations member state

Commonwealth of Nations flag

A Commonwealth citizen is a citizen of a Commonwealth of Nations member state. While most Commonwealth countries do not distinguish between them and the citizens of other countries, some grant limited rights and privileges. For example, in 14 Commonwealth countries, resident Commonwealth citizens are eligible to vote in elections. The status is most significant in the United Kingdom, where they are not considered foreign nationals under British law. They may be eligible to vote in elections, stand for public office, and access certain public services, subject to their right of abode (e.g. indefinite leave to remain).

In addition to voting and residency rights, in certain situations, Commonwealth citizens may receive consular assistance from fellow Commonwealth countries. Notably, they are entitled to emergency assistance from British embassies and consulates when in a non-Commonwealth country where their own government has no diplomatic representation.

== Background ==
Commonwealth citizenship emerged gradually as the British Empire dissolved. Prior to 1949, all imperial subjects were classified as British subjects and owed allegiance to the Crown. Following the First World War, the Dominions, including Australia, Canada, Ireland, Newfoundland, New Zealand and South Africa, enacted their own nationality laws, but continued to recognise British subjecthood as a shared status with the United Kingdom and its colonies. However, increasing legislative divergence and growing Dominion autonomy led to the creation of Canadian citizenship in 1946, marking a formal separation from British subject status. This development, together with the forthcoming independence of India and Pakistan in 1947, prompted a comprehensive reform of nationality law.

The British Nationality Act 1948 redefined British subject as any citizen of the United Kingdom, its colonies, or other Commonwealth countries. Commonwealth citizen was also defined in this Act as having the same meaning. This change in naming indicated a shift in the base theory of British nationality, that allegiance to the Crown was no longer a requirement to hold British subject status. The change was also necessary to retain a number of newly independent countries that wished to become republics rather than retain the monarch as head of state. The common status of Commonwealth citizenship would instead be maintained voluntarily by the various members of the Commonwealth. Australian citizenship was created in 1949.

Initially, all Commonwealth citizens held the automatic right to settle in the United Kingdom. This was first restricted by Parliament with the Commonwealth Immigrants Act 1962, which imposed immigration controls on subjects originating from outside the core British Islands. The Immigration Act 1971 relaxed controls on patrials, those whose parents or grandparents were born in the United Kingdom, and effectively gave preferential treatment to Commonwealth citizens from white-majority countries.

Outside the United Kingdom, in some member states Commonwealth citizens also initially retained eligibility to vote in elections, to preferred paths to citizenship, and to welfare benefits. These privileges were removed on independence in most countries but retained in some. British subjects/Commonwealth citizens were eligible to vote in New Zealand until 1975, Canada at the federal level until 1975 (not fully phased out in provinces until 2006), and Australia until 1984 (though subjects on the electoral roll in that year are still eligible).

By the 1980s, most colonies of the Empire had become independent states. Parliament updated nationality law to reflect the more modest geographical boundaries of the United Kingdom and its remaining territories. The British Nationality Act 1981 redefined British subject in such a way that it no longer also meant Commonwealth citizen.

== Acquisition and loss ==
Map showing countries listed in the British Nationality Act 1981, which makes citizens of these countries Commonwealth citizens in Britain

Commonwealth citizenship is acquired by virtue of being a citizen of a Commonwealth member state or, in the United Kingdom, a country listed in Schedule 3 of the British Nationality Act 1981. This list closely follows the composition of the organisation, but is not always the same. For example, the Maldives left the Commonwealth in 2016 before rejoining in 2020. The country was removed from Schedule 3 in 2017, but legislation was not updated to relist it until 2021. Conversely, although Zimbabwe has not been a part of the Commonwealth since 2003, Zimbabwean citizens retain Commonwealth citizenship because the country remains on Schedule 3.

Most classes of British nationals other than British citizens are also considered Commonwealth citizens. British Overseas Territories citizens, British Overseas citizens, British subjects, and British Nationals (Overseas) all have this additional status. However, British protected persons and non-citizen nationals of other Commonwealth countries (such as Overseas Citizens of India) are not considered Commonwealth citizens, unless they are also citizens of any other Commonwealth country such as Canada or Australia.

Acquisition and loss of Commonwealth citizenship is tied to the domestic nationality regulations of each member state; there is no separate process for obtaining this status. It is automatically lost if an individual is no longer a citizen or qualified national of a member state, or if their country is removed from Schedule 3.

== Rights and privileges ==
Commonwealth citizens have different entitlements in each Commonwealth country, which individually have separate legislation specifying what, if any, rights they are afforded. The organization does not have a permissive system of free movement or labour and in over half of the member states, Commonwealth citizens do not receive substantially different treatment than foreign nationals.

In 14 countries and all three Crown Dependencies, Commonwealth citizens may register to vote after fulfilling residence requirements. In Australia, Bermuda, and the Cayman Islands, they no longer have the right to register as electors, but voters who were already registered before that right was ended may continue to participate in elections. Commonwealth citizens are also eligible to serve in one or both houses of the national legislature in Jamaica, Saint Lucia, Saint Vincent and the Grenadines, and the United Kingdom.

All Commonwealth citizens may receive consular assistance from British embassies and consulates in foreign non-Commonwealth nations during emergencies where their home countries have not established diplomatic or consular posts. They are eligible to apply for British emergency passports, if their travel documents have been lost or stolen and permission has been given by their national governments. Additionally, Australia issues Documents of Identity in exceptional circumstances to resident Commonwealth citizens who are unable to obtain valid travel documents from their countries of origin and must travel urgently.

When residing in the United Kingdom, Commonwealth citizens are eligible to be employed in non-reserved Civil Service posts and are eligible to enlist in the British Armed Forces. In addition, Commonwealth citizens were generally exempt from the requirement to register with local police, until the registration scheme was completely removed in August 2022.

=== Right to vote ===
The following jurisdictions allow citizens of other Commonwealth countries to vote:

- Antigua and Barbuda
- Barbados
- Belize
- Dominica
- Grenada
- Guyana
- Jamaica
- Mauritius
- Saint Kitts and Nevis
- Saint Lucia
- Saint Vincent and the Grenadines
- Trinidad and Tobago
- British Islands
  - United Kingdom
  - Guernsey
  - Isle of Man
  - Jersey

Access to voting in these countries is open to all permanent resident foreign nationals and is not exclusive to Commonwealth citizens:

- Eswatini
- Malawi
- New Zealand

=== Preferential citizenship acquisition and residency policies ===
- Pakistan permits Commonwealth citizens to acquire Pakistani nationality immediately upon arrival with a valid immigrant visa, which is obtained by depositing Rs. 5,000,000 (~$18,000 USD) in a Pakistani financial institution and completing a visa application at an overseas mission of Pakistan. However, Pakistan permits dual nationality with only 22 countries, including Canada, New Zealand, Australia, and the United Kingdom. Thus, most Commonwealth citizens must renounce their original citizenship to acquire Pakistani nationality.
- United Kingdom grants right of abode to Commonwealth citizens whose parents or spouses possessed right of abode, and under the Windrush scheme. The UK Ancestry visa is also limited to Commonwealth citizens (with grandparents born in the UK).
- Lesotho provides preferential treatment for persons from Commonwealth countries by waiving some conditions.
- Mauritius provides preferential treatment for persons from Commonwealth countries.
- Guyana, Jamaica and Malawi allow for a citizenship registration process for Commonwealth citizens requiring 5 years residency, in lieu of a naturalisation process requiring 7 years residency.

== See also ==
- Commonwealth diaspora
