= International Graduates Scheme =

UK immigration scheme

The International Graduates Scheme (IGS) was a UK immigration scheme which was launched on 2 May 2007 and ended on 30 June 2008, when it was replaced by Tier 1 (Post Study Work). It allowed non-EEA nationals who successfully complete a relevant UK degree or postgraduate qualification to work or set up a business in the UK for 12 months without needing a Work Permit. The principle of the scheme, and of its successor, is to retain skilled and educated graduates as part of the UK labour force, who will switch into a longer-term work schemes.

== History ==
The Science and Engineering Graduates Scheme (SEGS) launched in October 2004, allowing graduates with a UK degree in certain subject areas to work in the UK after graduation for twelve months.

On 1 May 2006, SEGS was expanded to include all postgraduate courses in any subject area that started after that date.

IGS replaced SEGS from 1 May 2007. However, applicants who had successfully completed their course before 1 May 2007 could still qualify under the old SEGS rules if they had successfully completed the relevant course in the last 12 months.

IGS and the similar Fresh Talent - Working in Scotland Scheme were discontinued on 30 June 2008, and replaced with Tier 1 (Post-Study Work) which was itself discontinued in March 2012.

== See also ==
- Immigration to the United Kingdom
- Points-based immigration system (United Kingdom)
