= UK Ancestry visa =

Visa issued to Commonwealth citizens

A UK Ancestry visa is a visa issued by the United Kingdom to Commonwealth citizens with a grandparent born in the United Kingdom, Channel Islands, Isle of Man or Ireland (before 1922) who wish to work in the United Kingdom. It is used mainly by young Canadians, Australians, New Zealanders and South Africans of British descent coming to the UK to work and as a base to explore Europe.

== Requirements ==
The main requirements are:

- to have a grandparent born in the United Kingdom, Channel Islands or Isle of Man at any time; or a grandparent born in what is now the Republic of Ireland on or before 31 March 1922.
- to be a citizen of a Commonwealth country (it does not matter how citizenship was acquired), applying from outside the UK. Zimbabwe remains a Commonwealth country for immigration purposes.
- to be aged 17 or over
- ability, and intention, to undertake employment
- ability to support oneself (and one's dependants) in the United Kingdom without recourse to public funds.

As a result of the Immigration Act 2014, the applicant may also be required to pay a healthcare surcharge as part of the process.

== Terms of visa ==
The visa is granted for five years in the "limited leave to enter" category. After this, the holder can apply for an extension (limited leave to remain) or for indefinite leave to remain (ILR). For ILR, the holder must show that he or she has been living continuously in the UK and is currently in continuing employment or has worked throughout the five years. The Home Office's guidance makes clear that if the applicant is working at the time of the ILR application, the applicant needs to show only that his or her current employment will continue. If not working at the time of the ILR application, the applicant will need to show that he or she has been continually working or looking for work throughout the five-year period.

This visa does not prevent the holder from undertaking study; however, to stay within the terms of the status the holder should also be working.

== British citizenship ==
After acquiring indefinite leave to remain, it is possible to apply for British citizenship by naturalisation after meeting normal residence requirements. See British nationality law.

- The increase in the period of time under UK ancestry to five years before ILR can be applied for effectively means that applicants (who are usually not married to British citizens) must wait six years for British citizenship. This is because naturalisation as a British citizen for a person not married to a British citizen requires that ILR or its equivalent be held for twelve months.
- Children born in the United Kingdom to persons with UK ancestry (since 1983) are not British citizens by birth. However, the child can be registered a British citizen once the parent obtains ILR if the child is still under 18 (it is not necessary to wait for the parent to become British).

== Irish-born grandparent ==
A grandparent born in Northern Ireland at any time, or what is now the Republic of Ireland prior to 1 April 1922, gives rise to an entitlement to a right to admission under UK ancestry. However, there may also be an entitlement to register as an Irish citizen by descent which grants de facto permanent residency in the UK immediately.

This may be possible as an alternative to, or in addition to, a UK Ancestry visa.

== 2008 abolition proposal ==
On 26 October 2005, The Times published an article outlining possible plans by the British Home Office to abolish admission under UK ancestry in favour of a points-based migration system. The issue had apparently been raised in the House of Commons Home Affairs Select Committee. The possibility of abolition alarmed many people with British-born grandparents living in Commonwealth countries.

Scotland's First Minister, Jack McConnell, expressed his concern over the possible abolition of the UK Ancestry visa. Mr. McConnell had recently been in Canada to encourage Canadians of Scottish heritage to move to Scotland. Canada has over four million citizens that are of Scottish descent. Part of the reason for this campaign was the concern over declining population and birth-rate in Scotland. His campaign received a great deal of interest in Canada.

In March 2006, the announcement of a new points-based system made it clear that the ancestry route to the UK was outside its scope.

The abolition of this route was once again brought up by the Home Office in February 2008 in a green paper. After receiving substantial feedback during consultation, the proposal was revised in July 2008 to preserve the clearance, but to provide that people taking that route to go through a probationary citizenship stage before applying for British citizenship or permanent residence.

== See also ==
- British diaspora
- British nationality law
- Indefinite leave to remain
- Permanent residency
- Right of abode
