= European Union Settlement Scheme =

Immigration policy of the United Kingdom adopted in 2019

The European Union Settlement Scheme (also known as the EU Settlement Scheme or EUSS) is an immigration regime of the United Kingdom introduced by the Home Office in 2019, under the new Appendix EU of the UK's Immigration Rules, in response to the Brexit situation. EUSS processes the registration of nationals of EU and EFTA countries who were resident in the United Kingdom prior to the end of the Brexit transition/implementation period (which followed the technical departure of the UK from the European Union) at 11 pm GMT on 31 December 2020 ("IP completion day"). Successful applicants receive either "pre-settled status" (a special form of Limited Leave to Remain) or "settled status" (a special form of Indefinite Leave to Remain), generally depending on the length of time they have been resident in the United Kingdom.

The system also provide rights to particular types of family members, whether residing in the UK before IP completion day or not, of those EU and EFTA nationals, as long as the family relationship existed by IP completion day (with certain exceptions, like for later-born children).

The system also extends rights to certain family members who resided with a British citizen in an EU or EFTA country prior to IP completion day.

== Application process ==
The application process is predominately digital. Applicants are encouraged to apply online, using an NFC-enabled iOS or Android device, and corresponding app, to scan the biometric chip on their EU/EFTA relevant passport or national identity card, where applicable, UK-issued biometric residence permit (BRP) or biometric residence card (BRC), after which they are free to complete the application on any internet-enabled device.

During the early stages of the Scheme's rollout process, there was a £65 fee for applicants above the age of 16 (the fee was halved for younger applicants) at the point of application. This was, however, dropped following pressure from a number of groups and individuals.

To complete an application through the online portal, citizens must have a valid passport or national identity card, and may be asked to provide proof of continuous residence if checks with the Department for Work and Pensions and His Majesty's Revenue and Customs cannot confirm the duration of stay using the applicant's National Insurance number.

== Eligibility ==
The EU Settlement Scheme applies to all EU, EEA and Swiss citizens resident in the United Kingdom prior to its departure from the European Union, and their family members. Relevant nationals who are not in their own right British nationals, or who do not already have indefinite leave to enter the UK or indefinite leave to remain in the UK, and who wish to remain in the United Kingdom, are encouraged to apply under the Scheme, or seek another appropriate immigration route, lest they face enforcement action.

Applicants who are EU and EFTA nationals relying on their own residence in the UK, and not on being the family member joining such a person after IP completion day, must have started living in the UK by 11 pm on 31 December 2020. 'Settled status' requires five years of continuous residence, with certain exceptions, like for children of EU and EFTA nationals who have settled status. Continuous residence is defined as living in the UK, the Channel Islands or the Isle of Man for five consecutive years, and for at least six months in any 12-month period during those years. Longer absences are permitted for specified reasons, such as one period of up to 12 months for an "important reason", such as childbirth, illness, study, training or a work posting. During the COVID-19 pandemic, allowance has also been extended for an additional long absence of up to 12 months for reasons related to COVID-19, and for absences beyond 12 months where COVID-19 meant that the person was prevented from returning to the UK or advised against such a return for a period of time. However, both a second long absence and an absence beyond 12 months affect the counting of the period of continuous residence.

The system also extends rights to certain family members who resided with a British citizen in an EU or EFTA country, when that residence was consistent with EU free movement law under Directive 2004/38/EC, prior to IP completion day. This protects rights existing under the Surinder Singh decision and related decisions of the Court of Justice of the European Union.

== Rights granted ==
=== Settled status ===
Nationals of EU and EFTA countries who resided in the UK prior to 31 December 2020 (whether nominally under the scope of EU free movement law or not) for a continuous period exceeding five years ('continuous residence') will usually receive 'settled status' – formally Indefinite leave to remain (ILR) under Appendix EU to the Immigration Rules. They are able to remain in the UK as long as they wish, subject to conditions, and retain the same rights to employment, welfare, education and public funds as previously; they may also apply for British citizenship upon meeting particular requirements.

Those granted 'settled status' may spend up to exactly five continuous years outside the United Kingdom without impacting their immigration status, and will lose their 'settled status' if they spend any continuous time of five years and a day or longer outside the UK.

Similarly, certain close family members who joined nationals of EU/EFTA countries in the UK or who joined "qualifying British citizens" in the UK after first residing in an EU/EFTA country together, and who have resided in the UK for five years, can also be eligible for 'settled status'. (In specific types of unusual situations, that five year minimum period may be reduced.) These close family members must register on the Scheme when they become resident.

Children born in the UK to nationals of EU/EFTA parents, where at least one of them is a citizen with 'settled status' at the time of the child's birth, automatically have British citizenship from birth. EU/FTA children born in the UK, with at least one of the parents has a 'settled status' after the child's birth, have an entitlement to acquire citizenship before the child's 18th birthday.

=== Pre-settled status ===
Nationals of EU and EFTA countries who started living in the UK on or before 31 December 2020, but do not have five years' continuous residence at the time they apply, are usually granted pre-settled status. They are allowed to stay in the UK for a further five years from the date of grant, and can apply during that time to change their status to 'settled', on completing five years' continuous residence. A 2023 modification to the scheme automatically added a further two years to those who had not yet attained settled status, for a total of seven years. A 2024 modification to the scheme made a further change and this extension was increased to five years, for a total of ten years. Beginning in January 2025, the Home Office began to issue settled status automatically on completion of the required length of residence, without the person having to make a further application.

Time outside the UK totalling six months (180 days) or more within any 12-month period may disqualify an individual from becoming eligible for settled status. There is an exception allowing a single absence of up to 12 months for an "important reason" as well as exceptions for certain long absences caused by the COVID-19 pandemic.

=== Others ===
Rights and status of all EU, EEA and Swiss citizens living in the UK remained unchanged until 30 June 2021.

== Statistics ==
By 31 March 2025, the Home Office had received 7,627,941 applications to the EU settlement scheme. Of these, 89% were granted settled or pre-settled status whilst the 11% were either refused, invalid, withdrawn or void. The countries with the most applications were Romania and Poland. 15% of the applications to the scheme were repeats.

Number of EU Settlement Scheme applications by nationality, 28 August 2018 to 31 March 2025
Country	Total
Austria	29,728
Belgium	56,191
Bulgaria	513,040
Croatia	18,232
Cyprus	38,044
Czech Republic	95,469
Denmark	35,420
Estonia	17,325
Finland	26,973
France	280,661
Germany	196,141
Greece	183,801
Hungary	195,338
Iceland	3,223
Ireland	18,327
Italy	740,175
Latvia	167,324
Liechtenstein	90
Lithuania	321,659
Luxembourg	2,372
Malta	9,840
Netherlands	174,476
Norway	51,123
Poland	1,274,404
Portugal	565,834
Romania	1,871,678
Slovakia	176,744
Slovenia	6,483
Spain	483,666
Sweden	128,596
Switzerland	24,848
