= Skilled worker =

Any worker who has special skill, training, knowledge

A skilled worker is any worker who has special skill, training, or knowledge which they can then apply to their work. A skilled worker may have learned their skills through work experience, on-the-job training, an apprenticeship program or formal education. These skills often lead to better outcomes economically. The definition of a skilled worker has seen change throughout the 20th century, largely due to the industrial impact of the Great Depression and World War II. Further changes in globalisation have seen this definition shift further in Western countries, with many jobs moving from manufacturing based sectors to more advanced technical and service based roles. Examples of formally educated skilled labor include engineers, scientists, doctors and teachers, while examples of less formally educated workers include crane operators, CDL truck drivers, machinists, drafters, plumbers, craftsmen, cooks and bookkeepers.

== History ==
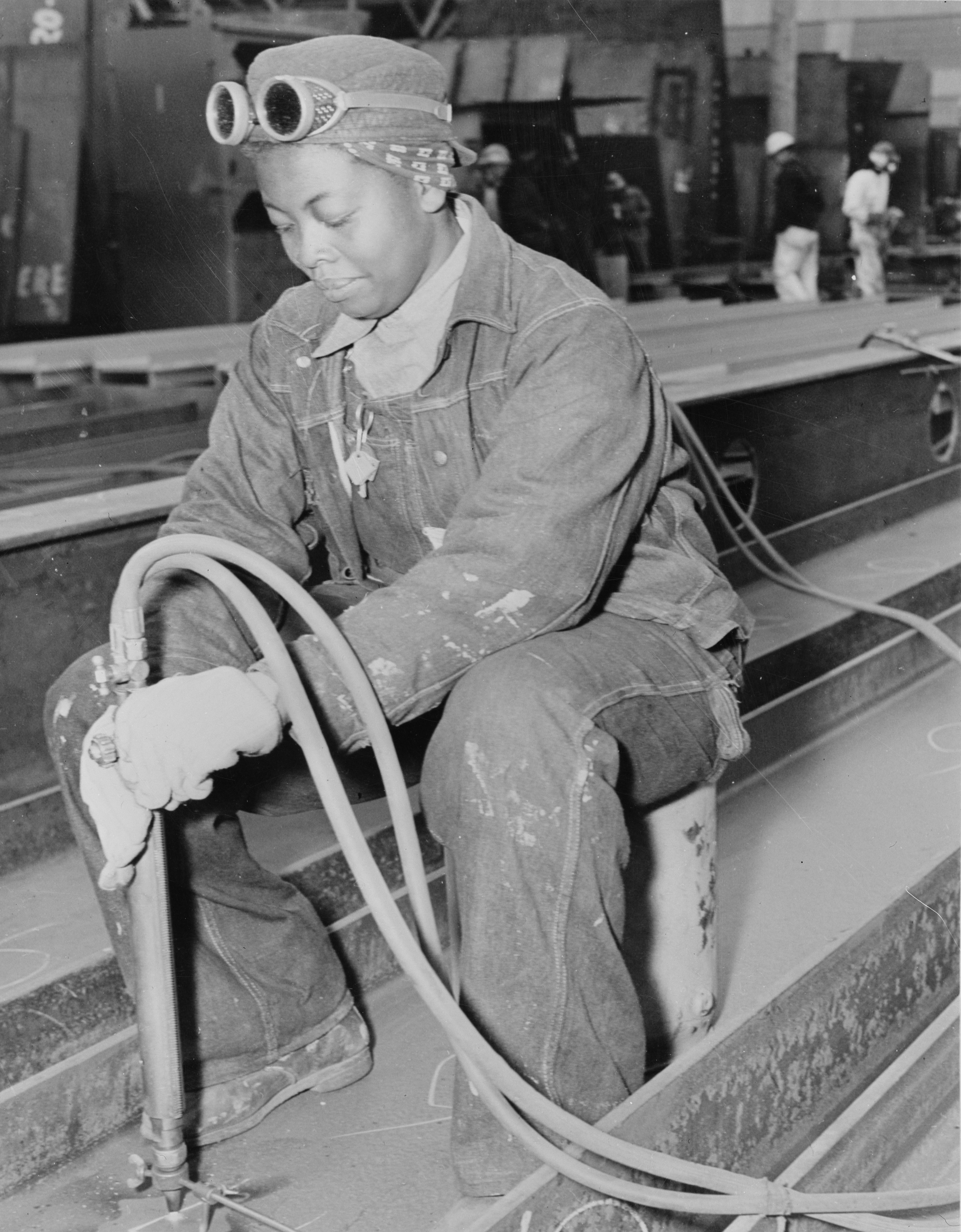
A skilled worker working at Richmond Shipyards

In the northern region of the United States, craft unions may have served as the catalyst to develop a strong solidarity in favor of skilled labor in the period of the Gilded Age (1865-1900).

In the early 1880s, the craft unions of skilled workers walked hand in hand with the Knights of Labor but the harmony did not last long and by 1885, the Knights' leadership became hostile to trade unions. The Knights argued that the specialization of industrialization had undermined the bargaining power of skilled labor. This was partly true in the 1880s but it had not yet made obsolete the existence of craft unionism.

...The impact of scientific management upon skilled workers should not be overstressed, especially in the period before World War I.

The period between 1901 and 1925 signals the rise and fall of the Socialist Party of America which depended on skilled workers. In 1906, with the publication of The Jungle, the most popular voice of socialism in the early 20th century, Upton Sinclair gave them ignorant "...Negroes and the lowest foreigners —Greeks, Roumanians, Sicilians, and Slovaks" hell.

There was a divergence in status within the working class between skilled and unskilled labor due to the fall in prices of some products and the skilled workers' rising standard of living after the depression of 1929. Skilled workers were the heart of the labor movement before World War I but during the 1920s, they lost much of their enthusiasm and the movement suffered thereby.

In the 20th century, in Nazi Germany, the lower class was subdivided into:

- agricultural workers,
- unskilled and semi-skilled workers,
- skilled craft workers,
- other skilled workers and
- domestic workers.

After the end of World War II, West Germany surpassed France in the employment of skilled labor needed at a time when industrialization was sweeping Europe at a fast pace. West Germany's preponderance in the training of skilled workers, was the main factor to outweigh the balance between the two countries. In the period between 1950 and 1970, the number of technicians and engineers in West Germany rose from 160,000 to approximately 570,000 by promoting skilled workers through the ranks so that those who were performing skilled labor in 1950 had already become technicians and engineers by 1970.

In the first decade of the 21st century, the average wage of a highly skilled machinist in the United States of America is $3,000 to $4,000 per month. In China, the average wage for a factory worker is $150 a month.

In manufacturing in the United States, there has been a change in the concentration of skilled workers from the areas of past economic might e. g. steel, automobile, textile and chemicals to the more recent (21st century) industry developments e. g. computers, telecommunications and information technology which is commonly stated to represent a plus rather than a minus for the American standard of living.

== Overview ==
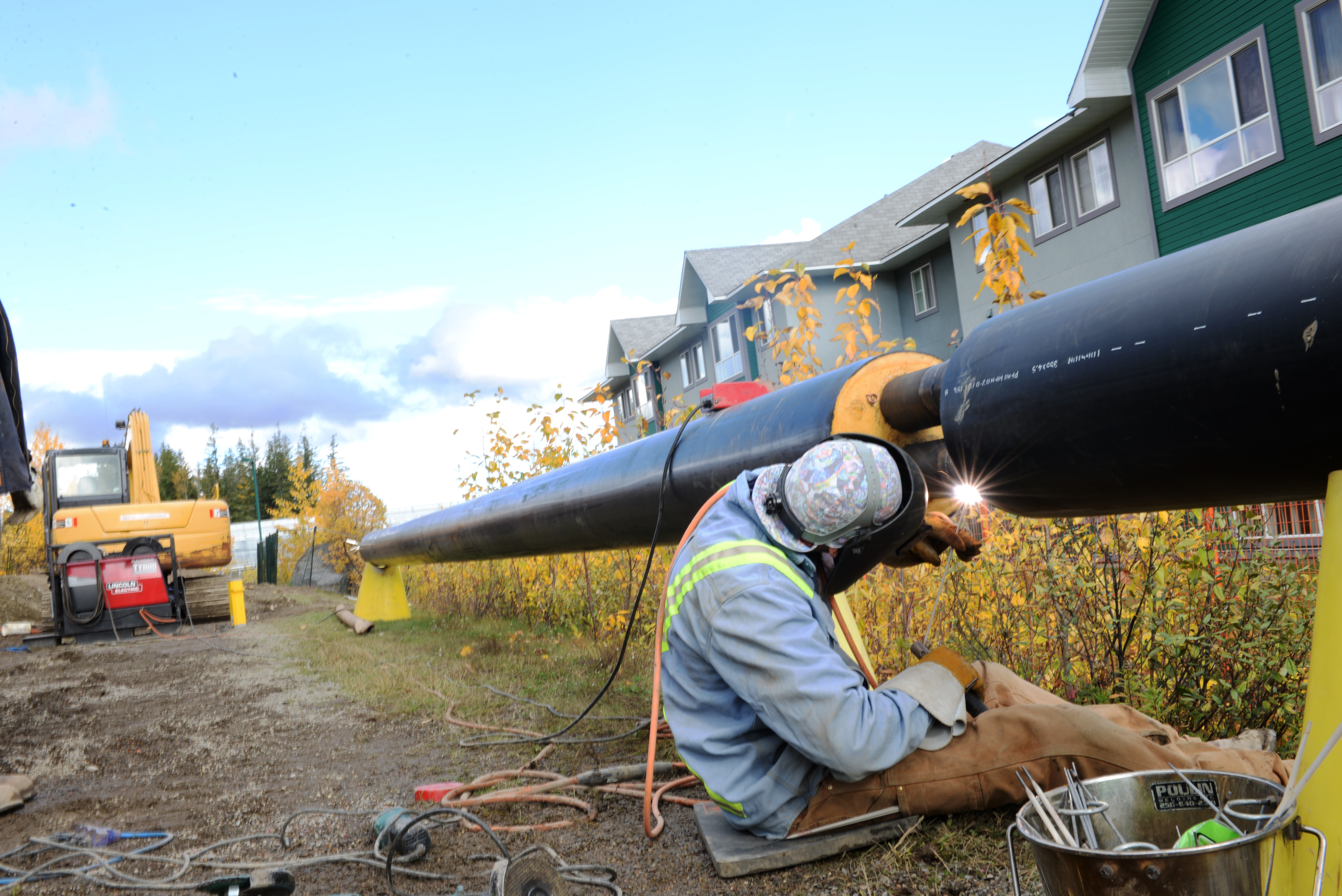
A skilled worker welding a pipe in British Columbia, Canada, 2014

In addition to the general use of the term, various agencies or governments, both federal and local, may require skilled workers to meet additional specifications. Such definitions can affect matters such as occupational licensing and eligibility for travel or residency. For example, according to US Citizenship and Immigration Services, skilled worker positions are not seasonal or temporary and require at least two years of experience or training.

Skilled work varies in type (service versus labor), education requirements (apprenticeship versus graduate college) and availability (freelance versus on-call). Each differences are often reflected in titling, opportunity, responsibility and (most significantly) salary.

Both skilled and non-skilled workers are vital and indispensable for the smooth-running of a free-market and/or capitalist society. According to Alan Greenspan, former chairman of the Federal Reserve Bank, "Enhancing elementary and secondary school sensitivity to market forces should help restore the balance between the demand for and the supply of skilled workers in the United States."

Generally, however, individual skilled workers are more valued to a given company than individual non-skilled workers, as skilled workers tend to be more difficult to replace. As a result, skilled workers tend to demand more in the way of financial compensation because of their efforts. According to Greenspan, corporate managers are willing to bid up pay packages to acquire skilled workers as they identify the lack of skilled labor as one of today's greatest problems.

== Skill acquirement ==
Skills can be delivered in a variety of manners, and is certified, licensed or acknowledged through various means:

- On-the-job training - (Examples: bartender, fashion model, salesperson, sanitation worker, truck driver, waiter)
- Apprenticeship - (Examples: carpenter, electrician, lineman, mason, mechanic, plumber, welder)
- Vocational Degree - (Examples: chef, cosmetologist, dental assistant, paralegal)
- Associate Degree - (Examples: diagnostic medical sonographer, draftsman, health care assistant, HVAC technician, licensed practical nurse, medical laboratory technician, optician, web developer)
- Higher Apprenticeship - (Examples: Chartered Engineer, Chartered Accountant, Management Consultant, Lawyer)
- Undergraduate Degree - (Examples: accountant, journalist, registered nurse, software engineer, elementary or high school teacher)
- Professional Degree - (Examples: architect, dentist, engineer, executive, investment banker, lawyer, pharmacist, physician)
- Graduate Degree - (Examples: astronaut, historian, mathematician, nurse anesthetist, scientist, university professor)
- Educational aims and objectives
- Academic certificate

Shortages of skilled worker have been attributed on shortcomings of the educational sector and low remuneration.

== Benefits ==
Skilled workers are valuable assets to companies. Benefits of a skilled workforce include:

- Increased productivity - Companies may benefit from the increased specialization of workers as they have attained the associated skills of a job to a high degree.
- Economies of Scale - A group of skilled workers through increased productivity may help a company obtain cost advantages per unit that will help to increase profitability.
- Improved Safety - Workers who are masterful in their craft tend to not make large or catastrophic mistakes that may cause injury to themselves or other workers.
- Problem Solving - Skilled workers have the advantage of repeating a process many times. These workers have the ability to highlight inconsistencies and overcome problems that can save company's time and money.

== Human capital flight ==
Human capital flight is the migration of skilled workers from places of lower to higher opportunities in terms of training, working conditions, materialistic rewards and security. Human capital flight is a concern due to the richest nations benefiting from educational investment of the nations who can least afford to lose the most productive career years of their highly skilled professionals. This factor disincentives investment in education in both the developing and developed world, as foreign students and foreign workers limit opportunities for citizens in the receiving countries. Some developing countries see the migration of domestically trained professionals abroad not as a drain but as a gain, a "brain bank" from which to draw at a price; for these professionals, on their return with their accumulated skills, would contribute to the growth of the homeland; cultural factors favor the return of these professionals for a short or a long while. However, policy in the United States is geared toward making non-immigrant visas eligible for adjustment of status to permanent residence status.

=== Highly skilled workers migration intensity ===
The demand for Information Technology (IT) skilled workers is on the rise. This has led to a lessening of the immigration restrictions prevalent in various countries. Migration of skilled workers from Asia to the United States, Canada, the United Kingdom and Australia is common, specially among students and the temporary migration of IT skilled workers. Data shows, however, that the migration of skilled workers from Canada, Germany, the United Kingdom and France to the United States is only temporary and is more like a brain exchange than a "brain drain".

=== World Bank Policy on Fair Exchange ===
Brain Drain literature focuses mainly on the high cost of skilled migration for the homeland or sending country. This loss can be partly offset if the migration is only temporary. Developing countries invest heavily in education. However, temporary migration can generate a substantial remittance of capital flow to the homeland. This flow of capital plus the additional knowledge gained would do more than compensate the homeland for the investment made originally in educating the skilled worker. The key to temporary migration is a change in the trade and immigration policies of the receiving country and a stepping-up of the demands of the sending country for the return migration of skilled workers.

=== By country ===
==== Canada ====
On January 1, 2015, the Government of Canada implemented the Express Entry Immigration system under the Economic Class including the Federal Skilled Worker Program. Under Express Entry, Federal Skilled Workers across 347 eligible occupations who meet minimum entry criteria, submit an expression of interest profile to the Express Entry Pool. The profiles of candidates in the pool are ranked under a Comprehensive Ranking System.

==== South Africa ====
Under Apartheid, the development of skilled workers was concentrated on the white inhabitants but after the socio-political upheaval of the 1990s, these same skilled workers are emigrating, a highly sensitive subject in contemporary South African Society. The media in South Africa has increasingly covered the "brain drain" in the 1990s. Starting in 1994, when a democratically elected government took control of the reins of power, official South African statistics show a greater emigration of skilled workers. The validity of this data has been questioned.

==== European Union ====
The European Union brought policy into force that paved the way for skilled workers from outside the Union to work and live in the EU under the Blue Card (European Union) Scheme. The key reasons for introducing this policy are an ageing population in general and an increasing shortage of skilled workers in many member states.

==== Other ====
- Highly Skilled Migrant Programme (UK)
- H-1B visa, EB-1 visa, O visa (USA)
- Points-based immigration system

== See also ==
- The Protestant Ethic and the Spirit of Capitalism, an essay written by Max Weber
- Bangladesh Association of International Recruiting Agencies
- Automation
- Blue-collar worker
- Deskilling
- Global labor arbitrage
- Occupational licensing
- Outsourcing
- Scientific management
- Skill sharing
- Unionization
- Professional
- Tradesman
