= Indefinite leave to remain =

British immigration status

Indefinite leave to remain (ILR) is an immigration status granted to a person who does not hold the right of abode in the United Kingdom (UK), but who has been admitted to the UK without any time limit on their stay and who is free to take up employment, engage in business, self-employment, or study. When indefinite leave is granted to persons outside the United Kingdom it is known as indefinite leave to enter (ILE).

It approximates to the concept of permanent residency (PR) in other countries, but that term had a different and specific meaning under the EU law on freedom of movement while the UK was in the EU. ILR is granted under UK domestic legislation whereas PR was (before Brexit) acquired automatically, if certain conditions were met, under EU law.

A person who has indefinite leave to remain, the right of abode or Irish citizenship has settled status if resident in the United Kingdom (all full British citizens have the right of abode). A person with indefinite leave to remain is eligible for access to public funds and welfare in the UK. Settled status is central to British nationality law, as the most usual route to naturalisation or registration as a British citizen requires that the applicant be settled in the UK. Settled status is also important where a child of non-British citizen parents is born in the UK, as unless at least one parent has settled status the child will not automatically be a British citizen.

A person who is resident in the UK under the Work or Family route will be able to apply for Indefinite Leave to Remain after completing qualifying period of legal stay in the UK. Indefinite leave can lapse where the holder has stayed outside the United Kingdom for a continuous period of more than two years. It is retained indefinitely if the holder remains resident in the UK with limited absences.

== Advantages ==
=== Acquisition of British citizenship ===
Holders of ILR may apply for British citizenship if they have held ILR for twelve months or longer, are over 18 and have been ordinarily resident in the United Kingdom for the last five years.

Certain ILR holders may apply for British citizenship under the registration clauses if they are qualified to do so (e.g., born in the UK or holding another form of British nationality). Registration normally costs less than naturalisation and applicants are not required to meet knowledge and language requirements.

=== Children born in the UK ===
A child born in the United Kingdom after 1983 to persons who are not British citizens will not automatically be a British citizen.

Prior to 1 July 2006, only a legitimate child (born to parents who are married to each other) could automatically derive British citizenship from the father, if the father was a British citizen or "settled" in the United Kingdom. However, if the parents are not married when the child is born in the United Kingdom, but then get married, and the marriage legitimates the child, then if the father was a British citizen or "settled" in the UK when the child was born, the child would become a British citizen and would be regarded as having been one from the date of marriage. This affects only children where the mother is neither a British citizen nor "settled" in the UK.

For children born on or after 1 July 2006, an unmarried father has broadly equivalent rights (compared with a married father) to pass on British citizenship to a child.

Where a child would be a British citizen but for the fact that the parents are not married, the Home Office will usually register the child as a British citizen under section 3(1) of the British Nationality Act provided that the child is still under 18.

If ILR is acquired after the child's birth, the child will not automatically be a British citizen. However the child can be registered as a British citizen under s1(3) of the British Nationality Act 1981 provided application is made before the age of 18. Alternatively, if the child lives in the UK until age 10, they will have a lifetime entitlement to registration as a British citizen under s1(4) of the Act.

Children born in the United Kingdom before 1983 are British citizens regardless of the immigration status of their parents (unless the father was at the time of the child's birth a diplomat accredited to the United Kingdom).

=== Public funds ===
Unlike people with Limited Leave to Remain (LTR) in the UK, ILR holders have access to public funds. "No recourse to public funds" is not written in ILR holders' visas. As a result, they are able to claim job seekers' allowances and other benefits that are usually available only to British and Irish citizens (and those with “settled” status).

=== Home student status ===
ILR holders pay home student rates (i.e. the same rate as British and Irish citizens) for study at higher education institutions in the UK. That is, they are not charged as international students, unlike LTR visa holders, if they want to study courses in any UK institutions.

=== Right to stand in elections ===
Commonwealth citizens who have ILR and are resident in the UK have the right to vote and stand as candidates in all elections.

== Acquisition of ILR ==
ILR can be acquired in a number of ways.

=== No residence ===
A child (including an adopted child) aged under 18 who holds leave to enter or remain with a view to settlement with a parent, parents or a relative who is a settled person and resident in the UK can apply for ILR using Form SET(F).

A parent, grandparent or other dependant relative aged 18 or over of a person who is a settled person and resident in the UK can apply for ILR using Form SET(F).

People satisfying all of the below criteria can apply for ILR using Form SET(DV):

- were given permission to come to the UK for up to 27 months or to extend his/her stay for two years as the husband, wife, civil partner, unmarried partner or same-sex partner of a permanent resident (even if that permission is no longer valid)
- were still in that relationship at the time they came to the UK or extended their stay as their husband, wife, civil partner, unmarried partner or same-sex partner
- can produce evidence that the relationship has broken down permanently since then as a result of domestic violence.

=== 2 years' residence ===
A person who has lived in the UK for 2 years with temporary permission to remain in the UK as the husband, wife, civil partner or unmarried/same-sex partner of a British citizen or a settled person and who intends to continue living together (and are still married or in a civil partnership, if applicable) can apply for ILR using Form SET(M), as long as he/she arrived in the UK or applied for permission to stay in the UK on or before 8 July 2012.

Note that a person living in the UK as the husband, wife, civil partner or unmarried/same-sex partner of a British citizen or a settled person who either arrives in the UK or applies for permission to stay in the UK on or after 9 July 2012 must live in the UK for 5 years (and not 2 years) to obtain ILR (see below).

=== 4 years' residence ===
- A person who has lived in the UK for 4 years with a visa issued before 3 April 2006 under the Highly Skilled Migrant Programme (HSMP) and Employment Not Requiring Work Permit can apply for ILR using Form SET(O).
- A commonwealth citizen who has served in the British Armed Forces for a minimum of four years: after leaving the Army can apply for ILR using Form SET(AF).

=== 5 years' residence ===
A person who has lived in the UK for 5 years with a visa issued in one of the following categories can apply for ILR using Form SET(O):

- Tier 1 or Tier 2 of the points-based system (excluding the Post-study work category of Tier 1 and Tier 2 Intra-company Transfer)
- work permit
- businessperson
- innovator
- investor
- representative of an overseas newspaper, news agency or broadcasting organisation
- private servant in a diplomatic household
- domestic worker in a private household
- overseas government employee
- minister of religion, missionary or member of a religious order
- airport-based operational staff of an overseas-owned airline
- self-employed lawyer
- writer, composer or artist
- UK ancestry
- highly skilled migrant under the Highly Skilled Migrant Programme (HSMP)
- Hong Kong BN(O)

A person who has lived in the UK for 5 years with a visa issued in one of the following categories can apply for ILR using Form SET(BUS):

- retired person of independent means
- sole representative of an overseas firm.

A person who has been granted humanitarian protection since 30 August 2005 and whose current 5-year permission to stay is due to expire can apply for ILR using Form SET (Protection Route).

A person who has lived in the UK for 5 years under the Gateway Protection Programme can apply for ILR using Form HPDL.

A person who has lived in the UK for 5 years with temporary permission to remain in the UK as the husband, wife, civil partner or unmarried/same-sex partner of a British citizen or a settled person and who intends to continue living together (and are still married or in a civil partnership, if applicable) can apply for ILR, as long as he/she arrived in the UK or applied for permission to stay in the UK on or after 9 July 2012. For those who arrived in the UK or applied for permission to stay in the UK on or before 8 July 2012, a 2-year period of residence (instead of 5 years) applies (see above).

=== 6 years' residence ===
A person who has lived in the UK for 6 years with Discretionary Leave can apply for ILR using SET(O). Form HPDL was used as an alternative depending on circumstance but this practice has now ceased.

=== 10 years' residence ===
A person who has lived in the UK for 10 years continuously can apply for ILR on the ground of 'long residence' using Form SET(LR) as long as all time spent in the UK during the 10 years has been lawful, and he/she has not left the UK for more than 540 calendar days in total (18 months), or more than 180 calendar days (6 months) at one time. In 'compelling or compassionate circumstances', the Home Office can exercise discretion over any excess absences over the threshold. If the person has gaps in lawful residence during the 10-year period, ILR can still be granted as long as each gap did not exceed 28 days and ended before 24 November 2016, or in 'exceptional circumstances' where the gap exceeded 28 days, or where there was a 'good reason beyond the control of the applicant or their representative' if the gap did not exceed 14 days and ended on or after 24 November 2016.

=== 7 years' residence ===
A person aged under 18 who has lived in the UK for 7 years continuously (lawfully or unlawfully, but discounting any period of imprisonment) can apply for leave to remain on the grounds of private life using Form FLR(FP) if it would not be reasonable to expect the applicant to leave the UK. During the 7-year period of continuous residence, the person must not have left the UK for more than 540 calendar days in total (18 months), or more than 180 calendar days (6 months) at one time. After living in the UK for 10 years continuously (holding leave to remain on the grounds of private life during this period), he/she can apply for ILR.

=== 9–12.5 years' residence ===
A person aged between 18 and 25 who has lived in the UK for at least half of his/her life (lawfully or unlawfully, but discounting any period of imprisonment) can apply for leave to remain on the grounds of private life using Form FLR(FP). During the period of continuous residence, the person must not have not left the UK for more than 540 calendar days in total (18 months), or more than 180 calendar days (6 months) at one time. After living in the UK for 10 years continuously (holding leave to remain on the grounds of private life during this period), he/she can apply for ILR.

=== 20 years' residence ===
A person who has lived in the UK for 20 years continuously (lawfully or unlawfully, but discounting any period of imprisonment) can apply for leave to remain on the grounds of private life using Form FLR(FP). During the 20-year period of continuous residence, the person must not have not left the UK for more than 540 calendar days in total (18 months), or more than 180 calendar days (6 months) at one time. After living in the UK for a further 10 years continuously (holding leave to remain on the grounds of private life during this period), he/she can apply for ILR.

Alternatively, a person who has lived in the UK for less than 20 years continuously (lawfully or unlawfully, but discounting any period of imprisonment), but faces very significant obstacles to integrating into the country to which he/she would have to go if required to leave the UK, can apply for leave to remain on the grounds of private life using Form FLR(FP). During the period of continuous residence, the person must not have not left the UK for more than 540 calendar days in total (18 months), or more than 180 calendar days (6 months) at one time. After living in the UK for a further 10 years continuously (holding leave to remain on the grounds of private life during this period), he/she can apply for ILR.

=== Outside the Immigration Rules ===
UK Visas and Immigration has discretion to grant ILRs outside the Immigration Rules (leaves outside the rules; LOTR) either where someone qualifies under one of the immigration policy concessions or for reasons that are particularly compelling in circumstance and it is almost certain that there will be no change in circumstances within five years.

== Costs ==
Prior to 2003, Indefinite Leave to Remain in the UK was free. However, since 2003, fees have been introduced and have risen each year in April. ILR Fees were introduced at £155 in 2003. Following record immigration in 2004–05, mainly from Eastern Europe, for the main applicant the fee was raised in 2005 to £335, in 2007 to £750, and in 2009 to £820.

In 2009 the Government introduced a £70 million Migrants Impact Fund. Economic migrants and students coming to the UK from outside the EU are charged a £50 levy in addition to their normal visa application fee. The fund is used to support the communities in which they live. A fee was also introduced for dependent applicants, at £50 each. In 2009 Premium Applications with an in-person appointment at a regional office were introduced at a cost to the applicant of £1,020.

In 2010/11 the application fee was raised to £840 (£1,095 premium) including the Migrants Impact Levy. The dependents fee was also increased to £129 each.

In August 2010, the new government scrapped the Migrants Impact Fund. However, the levy is still charged; the extra income "will now contribute to the cost of the visa and will mitigate increases that the Government would otherwise have had to make."

On 6 April 2011, the application fee was raised to £972 (£1,350 premium) including the Migrants Impact Levy. The dependents fee was also increased to £486 (£675 premium) each.

From 6 April 2012, the application fee was raised to £991 (£1,377 premium) including the Migrants Impact Levy. The dependents fee was also increased to £496 (£689 premium) each.

From 6 April 2015, the application fee was raised to £1,500 (£1,900 premium).

From 6 April 2016, the application fee was raised to £1,875 (£2,375 premium) per person (dependants also pay the same fees).

From 6 April 2017, the application fee was raised to £2,297 (£2,848 premium) per person (dependants also pay the same fees).

From 6 April 2018, the application fee was raised slightly to £2,389 (£2,999 premium) per person (dependants also pay the same fees).

From 8 April 2026, the application stands at £3,226 per applicant.

== Citizens of EEA member states ==
Before 2021, citizens of countries in the European Economic Area and Swiss citizens could obtain permanent residence status automatically after five years' residence in the United Kingdom exercising Treaty rights rather than ILR. The rights of EEA citizens are not governed by UK Immigration Regulations, but rather the EEA Regulations.

Under the law as it existed between 2 October 2000 and 29 April 2006, a citizen of an EEA state or Switzerland could be granted permanent residence on an application after four years' residence in the United Kingdom exercising Treaty rights (five years from 3 April 2006). Prior to 2 October 2000, citizens of EEA states were deemed to be permanent residents immediately upon taking up residence in the UK to exercise Treaty rights.

The change in the law in 2000 was retroactive. Hence, for example, a French citizen who arrived to work in the UK on 1 July 1986 would have been treated as a permanent resident between that date and 1 October 2000. From 2 October 2000, the status would revert to that of a temporary resident if an application for ILR was not made. On 30 April 2006, with five years' residence exercising Treaty rights accrued, that person regained permanent resident status.

=== Post-Brexit status changes and the EU Settlement Scheme ===
In 2018, the UK government has indicated that a new immigration status would be created for EU, EEA and Swiss citizens with settled status due to the fact that their permanent residence status would lapse following Brexit. The first version of the new scheme was unveiled in October 2018 while the full operation of the scheme would only start when the UK leaves the EU. On 1 November 2018, the Home Office launched a limited pilot of the scheme for certain persons working in higher education, health care or social care sectors and having access to an Android device. Under Appendix EU to the Immigration Rules, this new immigration status was confirmed as 'Indefinite Leave to Remain (ILR) in the United Kingdom' although citizens with the status would receive no physical documentation confirming this status.

The second version of the European Union Settlement Scheme was launched in 2019 by the Home Office to process the registration of EU citizens resident in the United Kingdom prior to its departure from the European Union. Applicants to the Scheme do not have to pay anything to apply, and if successful, receive one of two statuses, dependent on a number of eligibility criteria, most notably time spent before applying resident in the United Kingdom:- 'Settled status' or 'Pre-settled status'.

Citizens resident in the UK prior to 31 December 2020 and exercising Treaty rights for a continuous period exceeding five years ('continuous residence') will usually receive settled status. Those without five years of continuous residence at the point of application will typically receive 'pre-settled status'. Upon achieving five years of continuous residence, citizens with 'pre-settled status' may apply for 'settled status'. Pre-settled status lapses five years from the point at which it is granted.

Citizens who have been granted 'settled status' under the Scheme, formally Indefinite Leave to Remain (ILR) under Appendix EU to the Immigration Rules are able to remain in the UK as long as they wish, subject to conditions. Those with settled status retain the same rights to employment, welfare, education and public funds as previously.

Citizens with 'settled status' may spend up to exactly five continuous years outside the United Kingdom without affecting their immigration status, and will lose their 'settled status' if they spend any continuous time longer than five years and a day outside the UK.

Close family members may join citizens with 'settled status' before 31 December 2020, or 31 of December 2025 for the spouses and civil partners of Swiss citizens; these close family members must register on the Scheme when they become resident.

Children born in the UK to parents, at least one of whom is a citizen with 'settled status' at the time of the child's birth, automatically have British citizenship from birth. Children born in the UK, at least one of whose parents acquire 'settled status' after the child's birth, have an entitlement to acquire British citizenship before the child's 18th birthday.

Irish citizens will continue to benefit from the freedom of movement and will not be affected by Brexit due to the fact that the Common Travel Area agreement were signed before the UK's European Community membership and hence cannot be affected by UK's withdrawal from EU regulations.

== Immigration rule changes ==
=== HC 1016 ===
With effect from 3 April 2006, the period of time required to obtain Indefinite Leave to Remain increases to five years. These changes were debated in the House of Commons Standing Committee on 20 June 2006. All Labour MPs voted for preserving the retroactive aspect of the changes, while all other MPs voted that the Government should bring in transitional arrangements to allow those already in the UK before the rule change to qualify under the previous four-year rule. These changes were protested in demonstrations and rallies in London on 16 June and 23 July 2006.

The changes were retroactive in the sense that people on a four-year visas must apply for a one-year extension before they can apply for ILR, but they did not affect people who had already been granted ILR after four years.

=== HC 398 ===
As from 2 April 2007, a new condition has been added that "the applicant has sufficient knowledge of the English language and sufficient knowledge about life in the United Kingdom, unless he is under the age of 18 or aged 65 or over at the time he makes his application."

There are two ways the applicant can meet this condition:

- by passing a test called the "Life in the UK Test". The test is taken on a computer at one of the 100 or so Life in the UK Test centres in the UK. It consists of 24 questions based on the information contained in the handbook "Life in the United Kingdom: A Journey to Citizenship" (2nd Edition) and requires a language ability the equivalent of ESOL Entry 3.
- by attending an English for Speakers of Other Languages (ESOL) course which includes citizenship materials, and progressing from one ESOL level to the next. It is stated that on average students require between 200 and 450 hours of tuition for each ESOL level.

=== HC 194 ===
On 9 July 2012, the 14-year rule (paragraph 276B(i)(b)) (which provided a route to settlement on the grounds of long residence, lawful or unlawful) was withdrawn. Instead, the new Immigration Rules provided that at least 20 years' continuous residence, lawful or unlawful, would, subject to criminality and other criteria, normally be necessary to establish a claim to remain in the UK on the basis of the Article 8 right to respect for private life. (The 10-year rule (paragraph 276B(i)(a)), which provides a route to settlement on the grounds of continuous lawful residence in the UK of at least 10 years, was unaffected and remains in place).

ILR may also be curtailed by the Home Secretary for reasons of national security or if the holder of the ILR commits an offence that could lead to their deportation from the United Kingdom.

A person may also lose ILR by leaving the United Kingdom for more than two years. However, in some circumstances, such a person may reapply for indefinite leave to enter the UK.

British Overseas citizens, British subjects and British protected persons do not lose ILR no matter how long they stay outside the UK.

== See also ==
- British nationality law
- Leave to enter
- Life in the UK test
- Permanent residency
- Right of abode
- UK Ancestry Entry Clearance
- Long-term resident (European Union)
- European Union Settlement Scheme
