= Highly Skilled Migrant Programme =

The Highly Skilled Migrant Programme (HSMP) was a scheme from 2002 until 2008, that was designed to allow highly skilled people to immigrate into the United Kingdom to look for work or self-employment opportunities. It was different from the standard UK work permit scheme in that applicants did not need a specific job offer in the UK. It has now been replaced by Tier 1 (General) of the new points-based immigration system for those who are already living in the UK with HSMP and Tier 2 for those who are currently living outside of the UK or living in the UK in a different immigration category.

== History ==
The Highly Skilled Migrant Programme was introduced on 28 January 2002. The scheme was significantly changed in two ways. First, with effect from 3 April 2006 (Immigration rule change - HC 1016) HSMP visa holders who were previously guaranteed settlement after four years now had to wait five years before applying for ILR. Secondly, on 7 November 2006 (with changes taking effect from 8 November 2006), with a points-based assessment for new applicants and those wishing to extend their stay (FLR) being introduced. This prompted protests, with many HSMP visa holders fearing that the retrospective nature of the changes will force them out of the UK, and the joint House of Commons and House of Lords Human Rights Committee criticizing the retrospective nature of the changes for breaching human rights legislation and finding that the case to revisit the retrospective nature of the changes was "overwhelming". The application of these HSMP changes to those already in the UK as HSMP holders as at 7 November 2006 was ruled as unlawful in a judicial review and the UK Border Agency subsequently honoured the FLR outcome of the judicial review, implementing a remedy which allowed impacted migrants, including those who left the country, to apply to have leave under the new points-based UK immigration system instated in place of their lost HSMP leave.

== HSMP replacement: (Tier 1 General) ==
In March 2008, the HSMP programme was replaced by Tier 1 (General) of the new points-based immigration system. The system remains similar to the previous HSMP system, with additional points required for Maintenance/Savings, and additional points for English language ability.

== HSMP and Indefinite Leave To Remain ==
HSMP Forum won the ILR Review on 6 April 2009. According to the High Court Decision, the HSMP visa holders who were admitted under the HSMP scheme before the April 2006 changes will now get the Indefinite leave to remain after 4 years as originally promised to them as per the terms valid at that time, but the HSMP visa holders who admitted after April 2006 changes will get it after 5 years as per new terms.

== Points system ==
The HSMP system was a points-based immigration scheme, requiring a minimum of 75 points to qualify. From 8 November 2006 until closure points were awarded for educational qualifications (maximum of 50 points), past earnings based on a country banding system (45), age (20) and UK experience (5). Applicants also had to demonstrate English language ability and that they had sufficient funds to maintain themselves in the UK.
