= German residence permit =

German identity card

German residence permit Aufenthaltstitel
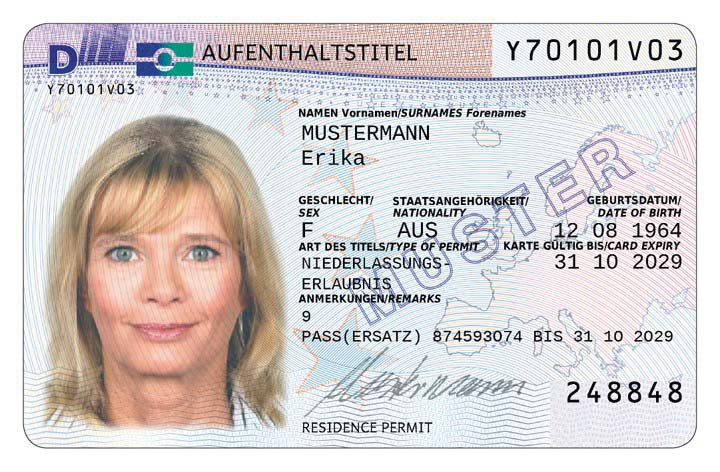
- Obverse

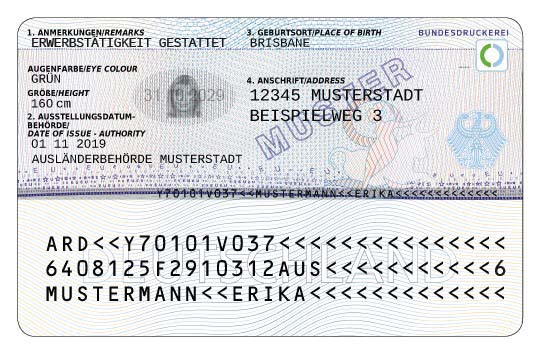
- Reverse
- Type: Identity card
- Issued by: Germany
- Purpose: Identification

The German residence permit (German: Aufenthaltstitel) is a document issued to non-EU citizens living in Germany.

Prior to 1 September 2011, residence permits and additional provisions were affixed to pages inside the passport in sticker form. Today, residence permits are issued as ID-1 (credit card size) plastic cards and the additional provisions are printed on a separate sheet of paper, so that residents have to possess, but not carry around, up to three different documents: a passport from their country of citizenship, their residence permit, and the supplementary sheet if applicable. Carrying passports and residence cards is only compulsory when crossing borders. Within Germany, it is sufficient to know where they are and to show them to the police within a reasonable amount of time, when requested.

== Legal aspects ==
=== Types of residence permits ===
==== Limited residence permit ====
A limited residence permit (Aufenthaltserlaubnis, lit. residence permit) is valid for a certain period of time and is issued for a certain purpose:

- residence for educational purposes
- residence for the purpose of economic activity
- residence under international law or on humanitarian or political grounds
- residence for family reasons

The Aufenthaltserlaubnis does not automatically grant the right to work; instead the permission to work must be explicitly mentioned in the document.

==== Unlimited residence permit ====
An unlimited residence permit (Niederlassungserlaubnis, lit. settlement permit) is a permanent residence permit. It grants the right to live and work in Germany under EU law. A foreigner receives a settlement permit if:

- they have held a residence permit for five years
- their livelihood is secure
- they are permitted to work
- they possess sufficient living space for themself and the members of their family forming part of their household

=== Additional provisions ===
Additional provisions (e.g. whether the resident is allowed to work) are stored on the chip and are printed on a supplementary sheet which must be kept together with the residence permit.

== Physical appearance ==
Since 1 September 2011, the residence permit is issued as ID-1 (credit card size) plastic cards with an embedded RFID chip. It is covered with multi-colour guillochés and appears pink-blue from the distance. All information on it is given only in German, except for the English words residence permit.

=== Front side ===
The front side shows the symbol for biometric travel documents, the German Eagle, the European bull, and the words "AUFENTHALTSTITEL" and "RESIDENCE PERMIT". It contains the following information:

- Photo of ID card holder (biometric photo)
- Document number: 9 alphanumeric digits
- Access number for RFID chip: 6 decimal digits
- Surname
- Given name(s)
- Validity of residence permit: date of expire or "UNBEFRISTET" (unlimited)
- Place of issue
- First day of validity: dd-mm-yyyy
- type of document: "AUFENTHALTSERLAUBNIS" or "NIEDERLASSUNGSERLAUBNIS"
- Notes:
  - Document number of corresponding passport
  - Date of expire of corresponding passport: dd-mm-yyyy
  - If holder is permitted to work: "ERWERBSTÄTIGKEIT GESTATTET" (employment permitted)
  - If additional provisions exist: "SIEHE ZUSATZBLATT" (see supplementary sheet)
- Signature of holder

=== Back side ===
The back side contains the following information:

- Place of birth
- Date of birth (dd-mm-yyyy)
- Nationality (three-letter code)
- Sex (M or F)
- Height in cm
- Colour of eyes
- Residence (postal code, town, street, house number)
- Issuing authority
- Machine-readable zone

=== Machine-readable zone ===
The three-line machine-readable zone on the back side contains the following information:

==== First line ====
positions	text	meaning
1-2	AR	residence permit
3	D	issuing country: Germany (Deutschland)
6-14	alphanumeric digits	document number
15	decimal digit	check digit over 6–14

==== Second line ====
positions	text	meaning
1-6	decimal digits	date of birth (YYMMDD)
7	decimal digit	check digit over 1–6
8	alphabetic digit	sex (M or F)
9-14	decimal digits	date of expire of the residence permit (YYMMDD)
15	decimal digit	check digit over 9–14
16-18	alphabetic digits	nationality of holder (three-letter code)
30	decimal digit	check digit over 6-30 (first line), 1–7, 9–15, 19-29 (second line)

==== Third line ====
positions	text	meaning
1-30	alphabetic digits<<alphabetic digits<alphabetic digits	SURNAME<<GIVEN<NAMES

Empty spaces are represented by "<".

=== Chip ===
The residence permit contains a RFID chip. The chip stores the information given on the document (like name or date of birth), the holder's picture and, if the holder is at least 12 years old, also his/her fingerprints. The additional provisions are also stored on the chip. In addition, the new ID card can be used for online authentification (e.g. for age verification or for e-government applications). An electronic signature, provided by a private company, can also be stored on the chip.

The document number, the photo and the fingerprints can be read only by law enforcement agencies and some other authorities.

To use the online authentification function, the holder needs a six-digit decimal PIN. If the holder types in the wrong PIN, he has to type in the six-digit decimal access code given on the document to prove he/she really possesses the document. If the wrong PIN is used three times, a PUK must be used to unlock the chip. The data on the chip are protected by Basic Access Control and Extended Access Control.

=== Security features ===
The residence permit contains the following security features:

- multicoloured guillochés
- microprinting: EU and DEUTSCHLAND
- fluorescent elements:
  - UV overprint: stars, lines, and EU luminesce in various colors under UV light
  - randomly distributed fluorescent fibres which luminesce under UV light
- tactile features:
  - access number for RFID chip is tactile
  - surface embossing: map of Germany and microlettering
- security thread: colour changes when viewed under different angles; is personalized: NNNNNNNNNN<<SURNAME<<GIVEN<NAMES<<<<<<<<<< (NNNNNNNNNN is the document number including a check digit; a total of 42 digits can be found on the thread))
- changeable laser image: shows either the date of expire or the holder's portrait depending on angle
- color-changing ink: the colour of the biometric travel documents symbol changes from green to gold to red
- 2D and 3D holographic security elements:
  - colour-changing holograms colour changes depending on angle (violet-blue-turquoise-green-yellow-orange-red)
    - holographic portrait: holographic reproduction of the holder's picture
    - four eagles at the left side of the holographic portrait: change their colour under a different angle than the portrait itself
    - document number: NNNNNNNNN, 9 digits
    - holder's name: SURNAME<<GIVEN<NAMES<<<<<<<<<<, 30 digits
  - green kinematic structures above the conventional picture:
    - EU Kinegram: bright E on dark background changes to dark E on bright background when document is tilted
    - hexagon: moves across the picture when document is tilted
    - stars: change their size when document is tilted
    - text on the left side of the picture; visible only under a certain angle
      - macrolettering: BUNDESREPUBLIK DEUTSCHLAND
      - microlettering: BUNDESREPUBLIK DEUTSCHLAND BUNDESREPUBLIK DEUTSCHLAND BUNDESREPUBLIK DEUTSCHLAND
  - machine-verifiable structure: a red spot which can be checked by machines
  - 3D eagle: a red-gold eagle visible only under a certain angle

== See also ==
- German passport
- German identity card
- Visa policy in the European Union
- Permanent residency
