= German identity card =

German identity document

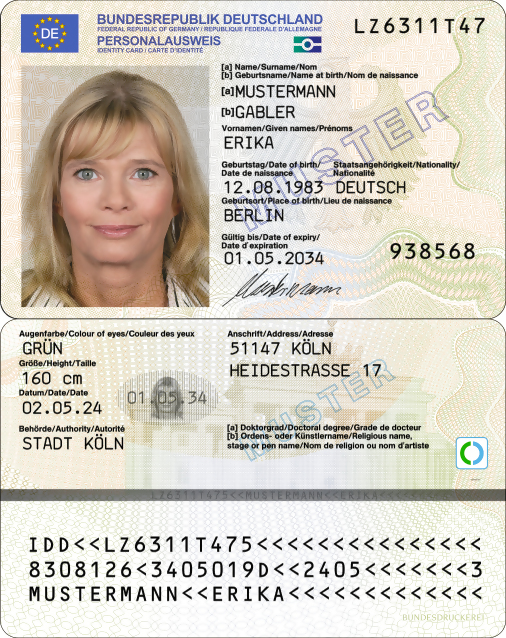
- Specimen of the credit-card sized German identity card issued since 2 May 2024
- Type: national identity document
- Issued by: Germany
- Valid in: EFTA; European Union; United Kingdom (EU Settlement Scheme); Rest of Europe (except Belarus, Russia, and Ukraine) Egypt; Georgia; Overseas France; Turkey
- Expiration: 10 years (age 24 or over); 6 years (age under 24)

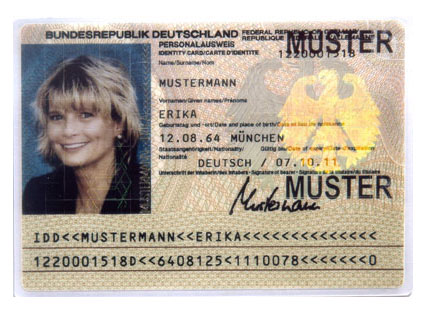
Specimen of the larger laminated German identity card issued between 1 April 1987 and 31 October 2010, valid until 30 October 2020. The holographic eagle – part of the Identigram feature added in 2001 – can be seen on the right.

The German Identity Card (German: Personalausweis, pronounced [pɛʁzoˈnaːlʔaʊ̯sˌvaɪ̯s]) is issued to German nationals by local registration offices in Germany and diplomatic missions abroad, while it is produced at the Bundesdruckerei in Berlin.

== Obligation of identification ==
=== Legal requirement in Germany ===
According to German law, every German national aged 16 or older, whose primary registered address and domicile are in Germany, must possess either an identity card or a passport as a form of identification. This legal requirement ensures that individuals can confirm and verify their identity when necessary. Simultaneous possession of both documents is allowed, but only those who do not have a passport are required to have an identity card. While police officers and certain government officials have the right to request these documents, there is no obligation to carry them at all times. However, exceptional circumstances may require carrying an identity document, such as when carrying certain weapons.

=== Issuance and availability ===
The German National Identity Card is issued by the municipal registration office (Einwohnermeldeamt or Bürgeramt) in the individual's district of residency. While it's not mandatory, German nationals living outside of Germany can also obtain the identity card through German embassies and consulates. To obtain or renew the card, individuals must undergo an in-person identity verification process.

Similar to German passports, German identity cards remain valid for ten years. However, if the cardholder is under 24 years old at the time of issuance, the validity period is six years.

The ID card currently costs €37 (€22.80 if the holder is under 24 years old on the date of issue) when issued within Germany.

== Travel validity ==
The validity of the German identity card for travel extends to all member states of the European Union, the Schengen Area, as well as the other European microstates such as San Marino, Vatican City, Monaco, and Andorra.

Entry is also possible in the Western Balkan states of Albania, Bosnia and Herzegovina (up to 90 days within 180 days), Kosovo, North Macedonia (up to 90 days within 180 days), Montenegro (up to 90 days within 180 days), and Serbia (up to 90 days within 180 days).

Furthermore, the German identity card serves as a recognized travel document in several other regions, including Egypt (where two photographs are required for an accompanying card), the Faroe Islands, all French overseas territories, Georgia, Gibraltar, Republic of Moldova, Northern Cyprus (up to 90 days), Turkey (up to 90 days within 180 days), and Tunisia (as part of a package tour by air).

=== Limitations and exceptions ===
Most other countries require a passport and, in some cases, a travel visa. The United Kingdom (including all dependent territories except Gibraltar), Greenland, and the non-European parts of the Netherlands do not accept the German identity card for entry.

When flying to French overseas territories, passengers may need to avoid transitional points in countries that do not recognize the ID card.

In the United Kingdom, when crossing the UK border and visiting the country, there is an exception until at least 31 December 2025 for accepting German identity cards only from individuals who have settled or pre-settled status in the UK under the EU Settlement Scheme.

== History ==
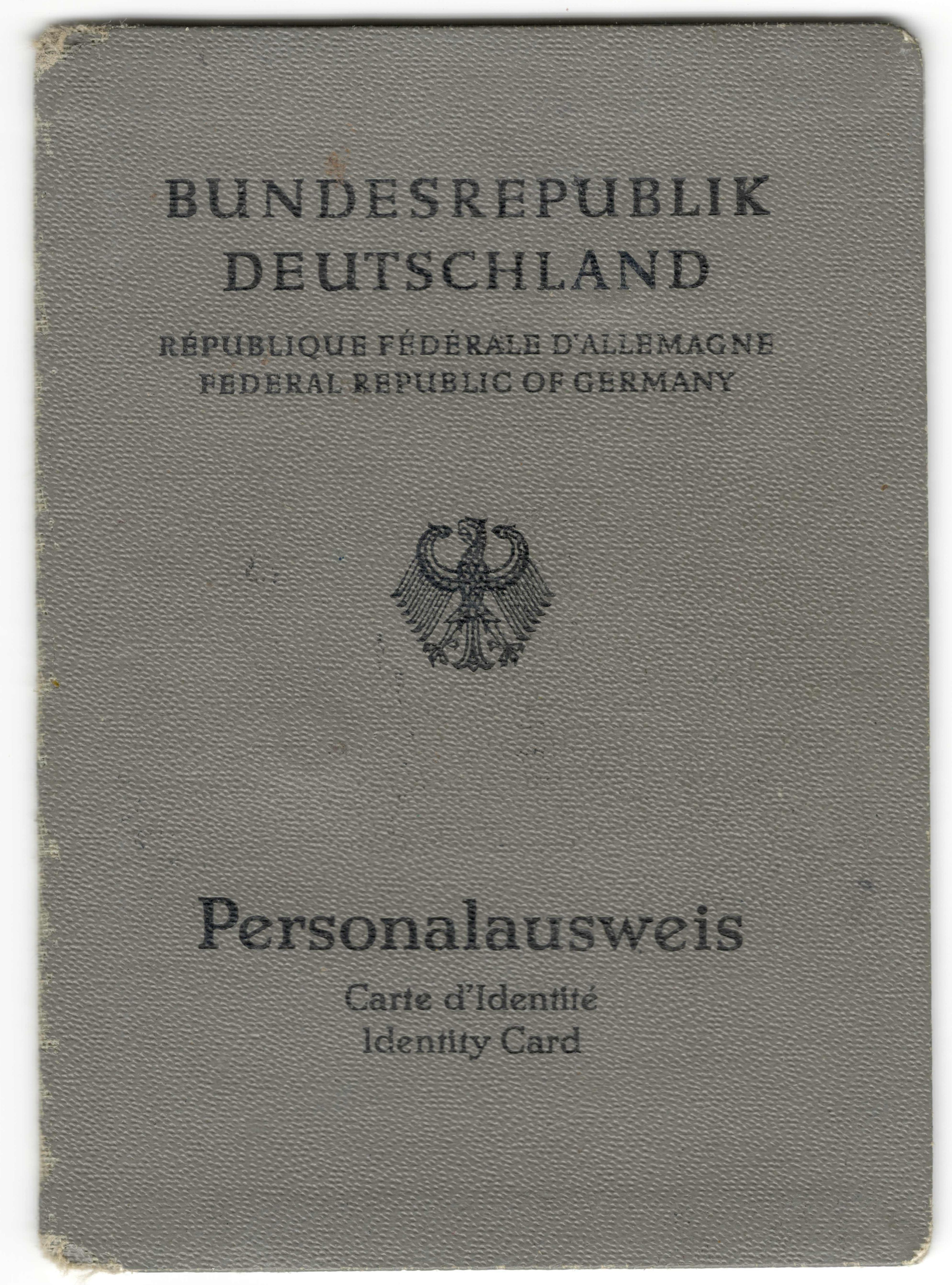
Front cover of the West German identity document (Personalausweis) in book form with grey cover issued between 1 January 1951 and 31 March 1987, valid until 1990

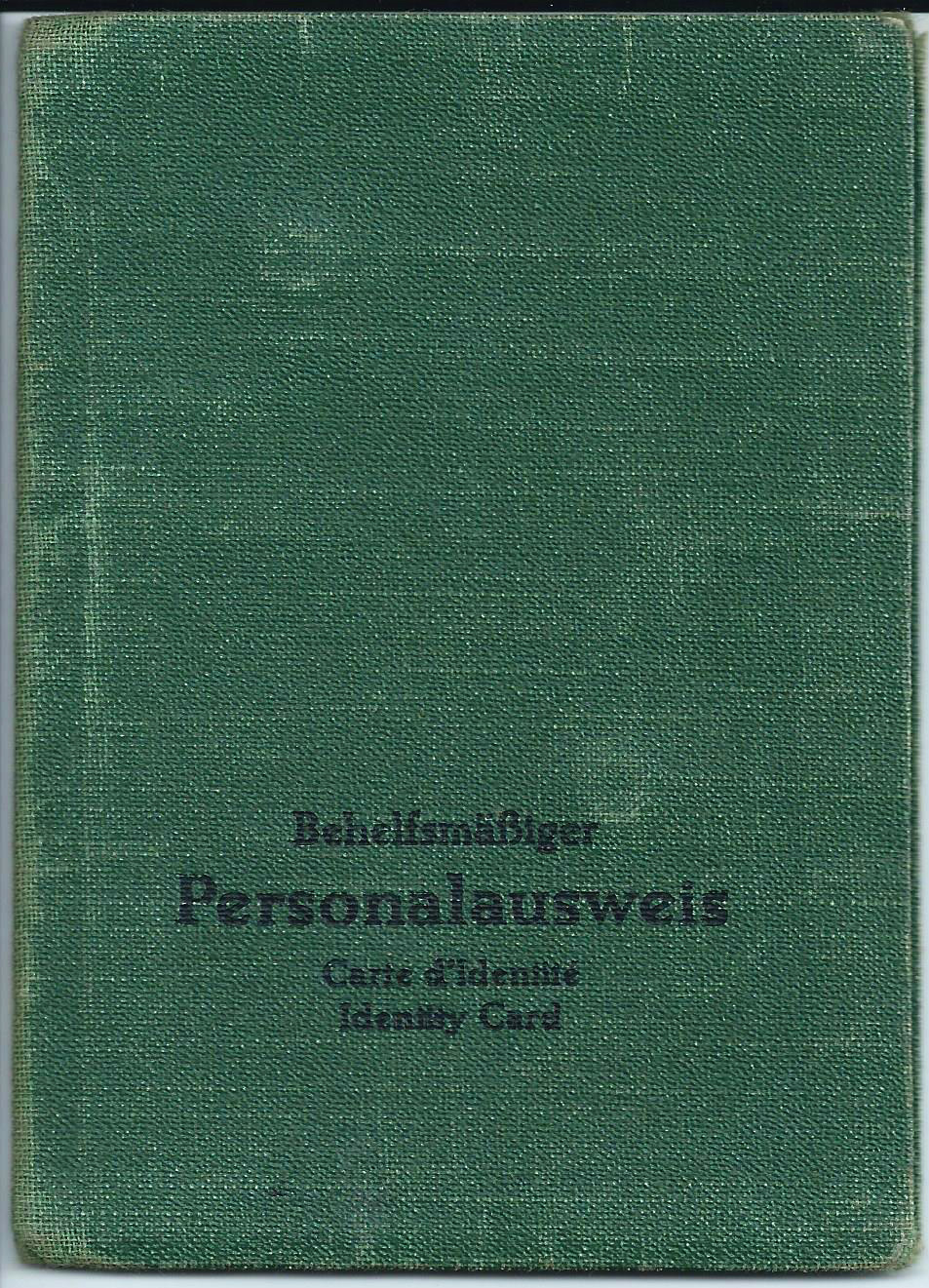
Front cover of the West Berlin "Provisional Identity Card" (Behelfsmäßige Personalausweis) in book form with green cover issued between 1 January 1951 and 31 March 1987

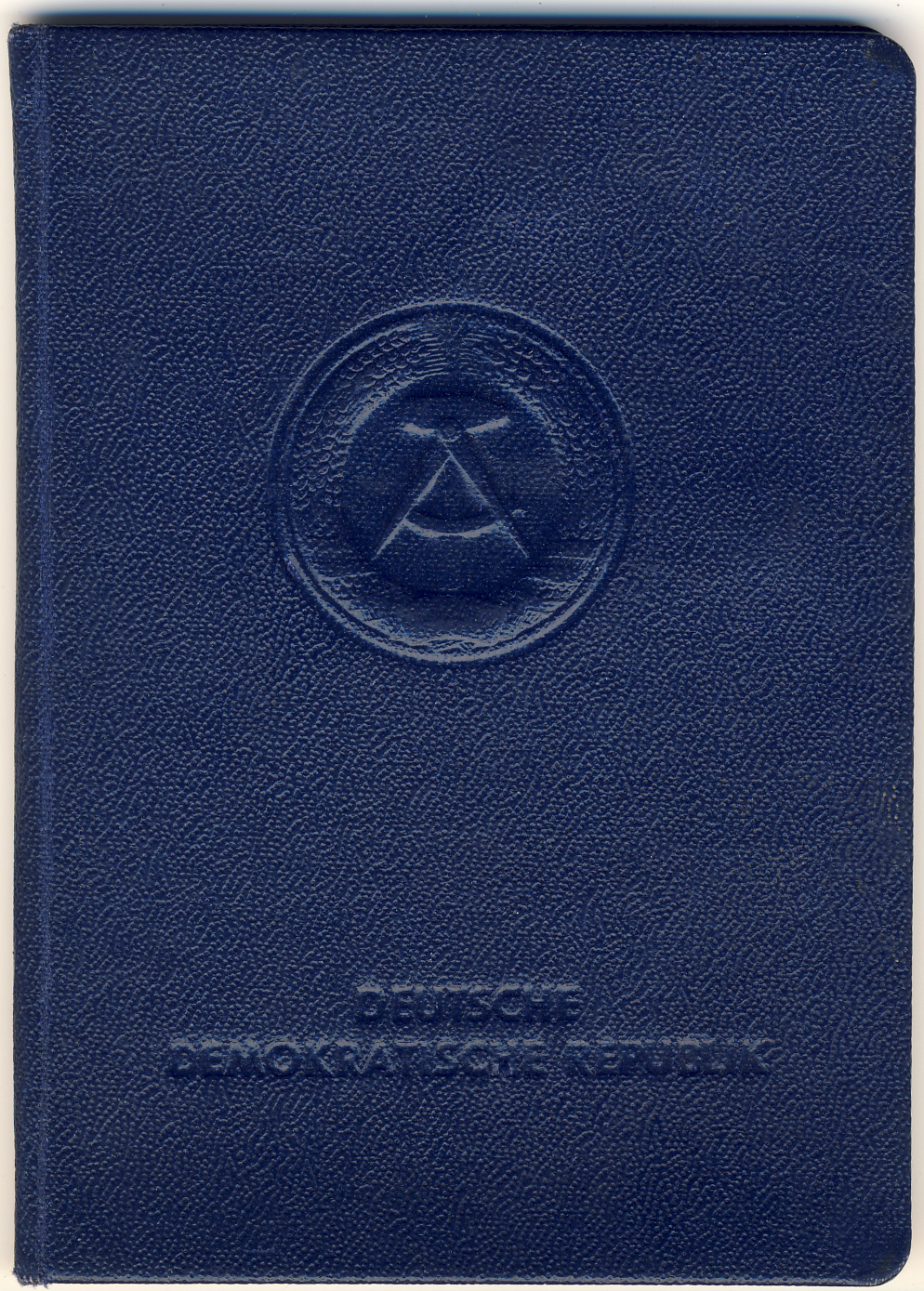
Front cover of the East German identity document in book form issued between 1 November 1953 and 2 October 1990, valid until 31 December 1995

=== German ID card evolution ===
During the Middle Ages, in the Holy Roman Empire—also known as the Holy Roman Empire of the German Nation—coats of arms, medals, and guild symbols functioned as important forms of identification.

From 1808, nobility register (in Bavaria).

In 1850, the precursor to the German identity card (Personalausweis) was the Passkarte (Pass card), which was introduced in the member states of the German Confederation. Unlike the modern-day identity card and passport, the Passkarte consisted of only a one-page document containing the personal description of the Pass card holder. It was valid for one year and allowed border crossings within the German Confederation without requiring special entry or exit permits. The cost of a Passkarte was 17.5 Kreuzer, equivalent to 5 Silbergroschen.

From 1916, the Personalausweis (Identity card) became the identification document substitute for the Passkarte (Pass card) in the German Empire, published in the Reichsgesetzblatt 1916, Volume No. 143, Act No. 5291, pp. 601–609. It included a photograph of the individual, an imprint of the left thumb, and a wealth of personally identifiable information.

From 1938, the Kennkarte (Identification card) in the German Reich served as a precursor to the modern-day Personalausweis (Identity card). The Kennkarte was the basic identification document used during the Third Reich era in Germany. It was compulsory for German men of conscription age, and compulsory for local border traffic. For Jewish citizens, as defined in the "First Ordinance of the Reich Citizenship Law" (Reichsbürgergesetz) enacted on November 14, 1935, obtaining and carrying this card was obligatory, as it marked them as Jewish and distinguished them from the rest of the German population; these cards were printed with a prominent 'J' imprint.

From 1939, identification and fingerprints were mandatory in German-occupied countries for police registration of residents; the holder had to carry this identification card (in book form) at all times.

With the beginning of the Second World War, compulsory identification was introduced. On September 10, 1939, the regulation on compulsory passport and visa stamps and compulsory identification was published in the Reichsgesetzblatt.

Due to the controversial special status of the four-sector Allied-occupied city of Berlin in the divided Germany of 1945–1990, only the "Provisional Identity Card" (Behelfsmäßige Personalausweis) without any indication of the issuing state was issued in East Berlin until 1953 and in West Berlin until 1990. The identity card that West Berliners received until 1990 did not feature the Federal Eagle due to a reservation by the Allied-occupied protecting powers of Berlin.

On January 1, 1951, the identity card (Personalausweis) was issued in the then-established Federal Republic of Germany (West Germany) and in West Berlin. It took the form of a hardcover small book in DIN A7 format (74 mm × 105 mm) with a dark grey cover for the Federal Republic and a dark green cover for West Berlin.

Additionally, from November 1, 1953, blue identity cards in hardcover small book form were issued in the then-established German Democratic Republic (East Germany) to individuals aged 14 and above.

In West Germany, including West Berlin, an improved tamper-proof identity card was developed in the 1980s. These cards were plastic-laminated and had document paper inset in the ID-2 format, as described in ISO/IEC 7810 (paper format DIN A7, 74 mm × 105 mm). They were issued from April 1987 onward. To prevent counterfeiting, it contained watermarks, guillochés, microprinting, fluorescent dyes, multi-colour fluorescent fibres, micro-perforation, including engraving and laser engraving on the laminated surface. The holder's photograph was printed directly onto the document paper inset, so it could not be removed or replaced by a different one (unlike the older ID documents, where the affixed photograph was eyelet riveted to the document page and over-stamped with the issuing authority ink seal).

After the German reunification on 3 October 1990, the West German laminated identity card was introduced in the former East German territory; unexpired East German identity document books could still be used until 31 December 1995.

On November 1, 2001, the Identigram on the laminate of the ID card as an additional security feature with holographic and kinematic elements was introduced.

=== Biometric data and security ===
On January 9, 2002, an amendment to the law allowing the use of biometric data was introduced. The introduction was justified with reference to UN Resolution 1373 of September 28, 2001, as a result of the terrorist September 11 attacks. The former Federal Minister of the Interior Otto Schily played a significant role in the legislation through the anti-terror laws he initiated.

In November 2010, the new electronic identity card (nPA, formerly ePA) was introduced in ID-1 format (credit card size) with a 13.56 MHz RFID chip (embedded in the top right) in which the personal data and biometric data (photograph and optionally two fingerprints) are stored. This would make it easier to identify the cardholder and the card can be used for official online services and E-commerce. The fee was raised to €28.80; from January 1, 2021, 37 euros.

On November 1, 2019, the new electronic identity card (nPA) underwent minor textual adjustments concerning the information field on the surname and surname at birth.

On August 2, 2021 (version number 2108), the nPA was adapted to Regulation (EU) 2019/1157. The changes relate to the fact that the country code "DE" is shown in white in the blue European flag on the front and that two fingerprints (as an encrypted image file) are now mandatory on the identity card. In addition, the version number has been added to the machine-readable zone of the identity card. The mandatory storage of two fingerprints (both index fingers, failing this, thumbprints) has met with criticism from data protection advocates but is intended to enable unambiguous identification. However, a report by the Netzwerk Datenschutzexpertise (Network for Data Protection Expertise) concludes that unambiguous identification is also possible with an imprint of the little finger.

On May 2, 2024 (version number 2405) the Doctorate was moved to the back.

Planned changes: On May 1, 2025, photographs for ID cards and passports should only be created at government offices or by professional certified photographers and transmitted digitally to prevent facial morphing or manipulation.

== Physical appearance ==
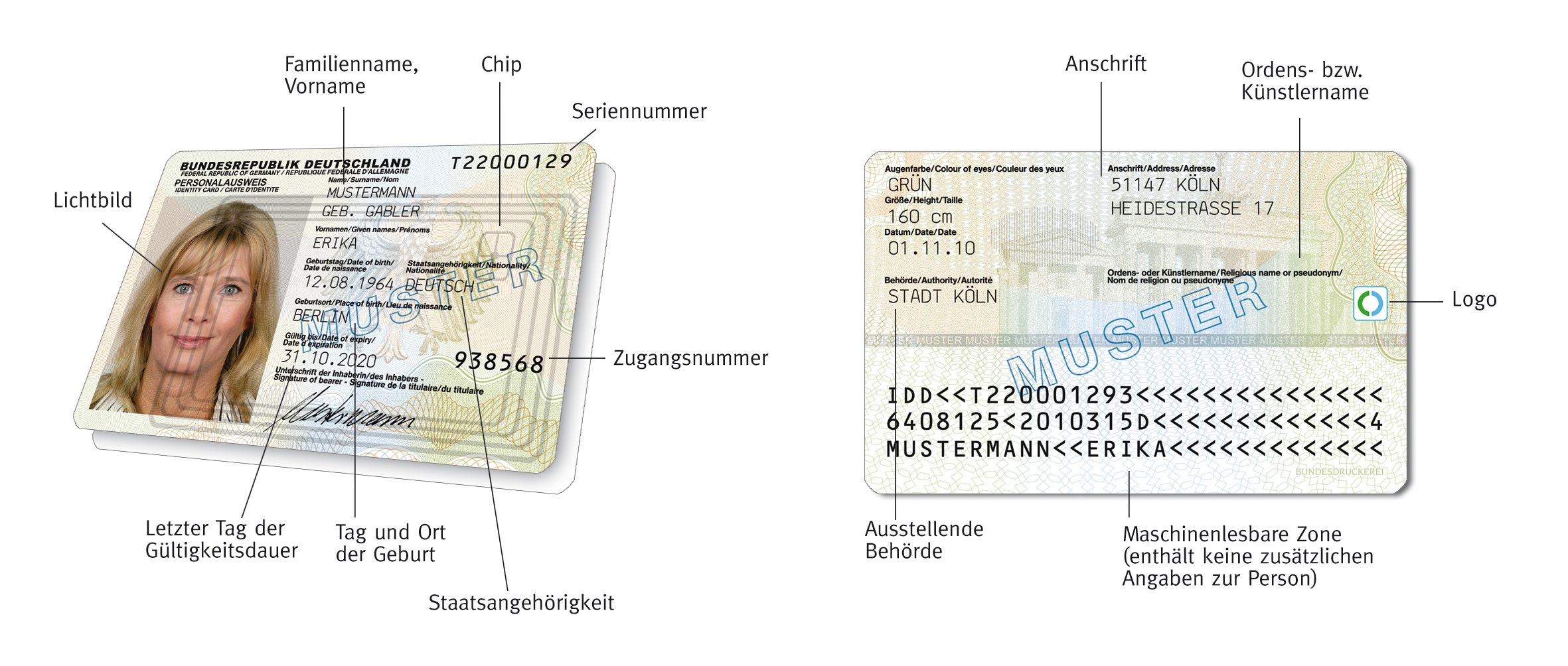
Structure of the new electronic identity card (version issued before August 2, 2021)

The current German ID card is an ID-1 plastic card (credit card size) with an embedded RFID chip. Biometric data, including fingerprints and a digital photograph, are stored on the chip. However, no central file of biometric data is created upon issuance. The card features multi-colour guillochés and appears green-brown from a distance. The legend texts, as well as the terms "Federal Republic of Germany" and "Identity Card", are also translated into English and French—the two working languages of the UN.

=== Front side ===
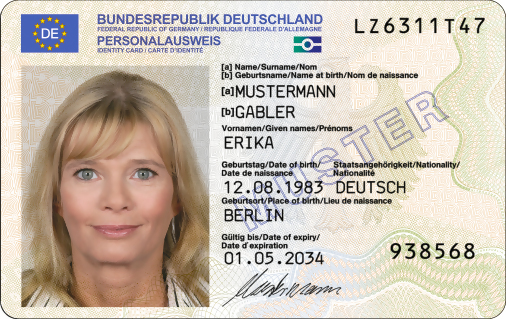
Sample front of a German identity card issued since 2024

The front side shows the German Eagle and the words "BUNDESREPUBLIK DEUTSCHLAND / FEDERAL REPUBLIC OF GERMANY / RÉPUBLIQUE FÉDÉRALE D'ALLEMAGNE" and "PERSONALAUSWEIS / IDENTITY CARD / CARTE D'IDENTITÉ". It contains the following information:

- Photo of ID card holder (biometric photo)
- Document number (9 alphanumeric digits)
- Access number for RFID chip (6 decimal digits)
- Surname
  - Doctorate (until 2024; only if holder holds this degree)
  - Birthname (only if differing from current surname)
- Given name(s)
- Date of birth (dd.mm.yyyy)
- Nationality (DEUTSCH)
- Place of birth (Only the city/town of birth, no country)
- Date of expiry (dd.mm.yyyy)
- Signature of holder

=== Rear side ===
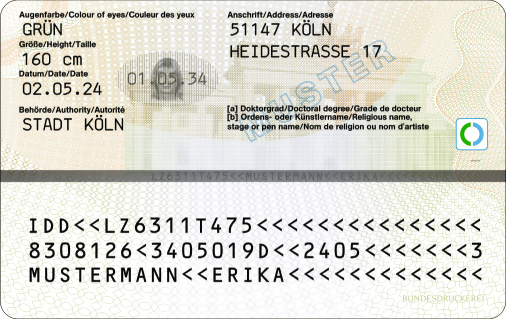
Sample back of a German identity card issued since 2024

The rear side shows the Brandenburg Gate. It contains the following information:

- Colour of eyes
- Height in cm
- Date of issue (dd.mm.yy)
- Issuing authority
- Residence (postal code, town, street, house number)
- Doctorate (since 2024; only if holder holds this degree)
- Religious name or Pseudonym (only if holder has one)
- Machine-readable zone

=== Machine-readable zone ===
The MRZ is structured according to the ICAO standard for machine-readable ID cards:

==== First line ====
positions	text	meaning
1–2	ID	identity document
3	D	issuing country: Germany (Deutschland)
6–14	alphanumeric digits	document number
15	decimal digit	check digit over 6–14

==== Second line ====
positions	text	meaning
1–6	decimal digits	date of birth (YYMMDD)
7	decimal digit	check digit over 1–6
9–14	decimal digits	date of expiry (YYMMDD)
15	decimal digit	check digit over 9–14
16	D	nationality of holder: German (Deutsch)
19-22	decimal digits	version number (YYMM)
30	decimal digit	check digit over 6–30 (upper line), 1–7, 9–15, 19–29 (middle line)

==== Third line ====
positions	text	meaning
1–30	alphabetic digits<<alphabetic digits<alphabetic digits	SURNAME<< GIVEN<NAMES

Empty spaces are represented by "<".

==== Different spellings of the same name within the same document ====
- German names: German names containing umlauts (ä, ö, ü) and/or ß are spelled in the correct way in the non-machine-readable zone of the ID card, but with AE, OE, UE and/or SS in the machine-readable zone, e.g. Müller becomes MUELLER, Groß becomes GROSS, and Gößmann becomes GOESSMANN.
  - The transcription mentioned above is generally used for aircraft tickets etc., but sometimes (like in US visas) also simple vowels are used (MULLER, GOSSMANN), so passport, visa, and aircraft ticket may display different spellings of the same name.

The three possible spelling variants of the same name (e.g. Müller / Mueller / Muller) in different documents sometimes lead to confusion, and the use of two different spellings within the same document may give persons unfamiliar with German orthography the impression that the document is a forgery.

- Non-German names: In some names of naturalised citizens, some special letters that are not available may always be replaced by simple letters, also in the non-machine-readable zone. The Bundesdruckerei uses the font UnicodeDoc, so that letters such as ç and ł can be displayed at least in the non-machine-readable ID card zone. In the machine-readable zone, special characters are either replaced by simple characters (e.g., é becomes E) or transcribed according to the ICAO rules (e.g., å becomes AA, ø becomes OE, etc.).

Names originally written in a non-Latin writing system may pose another problem if there are various internationally recognised transcription standards.

For example, the Russian surname Горбачёв is transcribed
"Gorbatschow" in German,
"Gorbachev" in English (also ICAO standard),
"Gorbatchov" in French,
"Gorbachov" in Spanish,
"Gorbaczow" in Polish, and so on.
German identity documents use the in Germany officially registered name in Latin letters, normally based on transcription into German.

German naming law accepts umlauts and/or ß in family names as a reason for an official name change (even just the change of the spelling, e.g. from Müller to Mueller or from Weiß to Weiss is regarded as a name change).

=== Chip ===
Newer ID cards contain an ISO 18000-3 and ISO 14443 compatible 13.56 MHz RFID chip that uses the ISO 7816 protocols. This chip stores essential information from the ID card, including the holder's name, date of birth, and photograph. Additionally, since 2021, EU regulations require the inclusion of the holder's fingerprints. In addition, the new ID card can be used for online authentication (e.g. for age verification or for e-government applications). An electronic signature, issued in accordance with the EU eIDAS regulation, can also be stored on the chip.

The biometric data can only be accessed and read by law enforcement agencies, border control, and other authorized authorities. All government agencies authorized to access the chip data have been supplied with reading devices that have been certified by the German Federal Office for Information Security (BSI). Agency staff can use these modules to display all of the personal data stored on the chip, including the digital photograph and, where applicable, the stored fingerprints.

To use the online authentication function, the holder needs a six-digit decimal PIN. If the holder types in the wrong PIN, they have to type in the six-digit decimal access code given on the ID card to prove they possess the ID card. If the wrong PIN is used three times, a PUK must be used to unlock the chip. The data on the chip are protected by Basic Access Control and Extended Access Control.

=== Security features ===
The identity card contains the following security features:

- multicoloured guillochés
- microprinting: BUNDESREPUBLIK DEUTSCHLAND
- fluorescent elements which luminesce in various colors under UV light:
  - UV overprint:
    - eagles and BUNDESREPUBLIK DEUTSCHLAND (in macroprinting): red-orange
    - BUNDESREPUBLIK DEUTSCHLAND BUNDESREPUBLIK DEUTSCHLAND BUNDESREPUBLIK DEUTSCHLAND (in microprinting): yellow
    - guillochés: turquoise
  - randomly distributed fluorescent fibres: red, yellow, turquoise
- tactile features:
  - access number for RFID chip and date of expire are tactile
  - surface embossing: map of Germany and microlettering BUNDESREPUBLIK DEUTSCHLAND
- security thread: colour changes when viewed under different angles; is personalized: NNNNNNNNNN<<SURNAME<<GIVEN<NAMES<<<<<<<<<< (NNNNNNNNNN is the document number including a check digit; a total of 42 digits can be found on the thread))
- changeable laser image: shows either the date of expire or the holder's portrait depending on angle
- color-changing ink: the colour of the text BUNDESREPUBLIK DEUTSCHLAND changes from black to green to blue
- 2D and 3D holographic security elements:
  - colour-changing holograms: colour changes depending on angle (violet-blue-turquoise-green-yellow-orange-red)
    - holographic portrait: holographic reproduction of the holder's picture
    - four eagles at the left side of the holographic portrait: change their colour under a different angle than the portrait itself
    - document number: NNNNNNNNN, 9 digits
    - holder's name: SURNAME<<GIVEN<NAMES<<<<<<<<<<, 30 digits
  - green kinematic structures above the conventional picture:
    - eagle: bright eagle on dark hexagon changes to dark eagle on bright hexagon to letter D in hexagon when document is tilted
    - hexagon: moves across the picture when document is tilted
    - stars: change their size when document is tilted
    - letter D: moves across the picture and turns into a star
    - text on the left side of the picture; visible only under a certain angle
      - macrolettering: BUNDESREPUBLIK DEUTSCHLAND
      - microlettering: BUNDESREPUBLIK DEUTSCHLAND BUNDESREPUBLIK DEUTSCHLAND BUNDESREPUBLIK DEUTSCHLAND
  - machine-verifiable structure: a red spot which can be checked by machines
  - 3D eagle: a red-gold eagle visible only under a certain angle

== Problems and challenges ==
Since November 1, 2010, the new electronic identity cards have been issued with online authentication functions to carry out administrative or business matters electronically, yet they remain unfamiliar to most Germans. Initially, ID cardholders needed to activate the online function using a PIN. In 2019, only 6% used their eIDs, while 32% hadn't activated the service. The lack of awareness and perceived value hinders adoption. Although automatic activation of this function since July 2017 aims to boost usage, trust and clear communication remain crucial.

Additionally, the eID is not applicable for many transactions compared to other countries. Only 45 services are available which can be used by all German citizens, the remaining 86 are only usable in specific municipalities and federal states (BCG, 2020). Introducing electronic services is costly, which means that there also exist adaptation barriers from the site of the provider, especially for small administrative offices.

The slow development is also problematic for the introduction of future electronic services in other areas. For example, the eID is a requirement for digital medical records offered by health insurances (BCG, 2020). This implies that the slow adaptation of the eID also slows down digitalisation in other areas.

== East German Identity Card ==
Identity cards in East Germany came in the form of paper booklets in a blue plastic cover, much like modern-day passports. On the outside, the Emblem of the German Democratic Republic as well as the words "DEUTSCHE DEMOKRATISCHE REPUBLIK" ("German Democratic Republic") are embossed. Inside the cover page there is a notice to the bearer:

Bürger der Deutschen Demokratischen Republik

Dieser Ausweis ist Ihr wichtigstes Dokument

Sie haben deshalb:

1. diesen Personalausweis stets bei sich zu tragen, sorgfältig zu behandeln, vor Verlust zu schützen und auf Verlangen der Volkspolizei vorzuzeigen bzw. auszuhändigen;

2. keine eigenmächtigen Eintragungen im Ausweis vorzunehmen, diesen nicht als Pfand oder zur Benutzung anderen Personen zu überlassen bzw. von anderen Personen entgegenzunehmen;

3. jeden Wohnungswechsel innerhalb von drei Tagen bei der zuständigen VP-Dienststelle zu melden;

4. jeden Verlust dieses Ausweises unverzüglich bei der nächsten VP-Dienststelle anzuzeigen.

Which translates to:

Citizen of the German Democratic Republic

This identity card is your most important document

Therefore you must:

1. carry this identity card with you at all times, handle it with care, protect it from loss, and show or hand it to the Volkspolizei on demand;

2. not make any entries into this identity card, give it to another person as a pawn or to be used, or accept it as such;

3. notify the responsible VP office of any change of residence within three days;

4. immediately report any loss of this identity card to the nearest VP office.

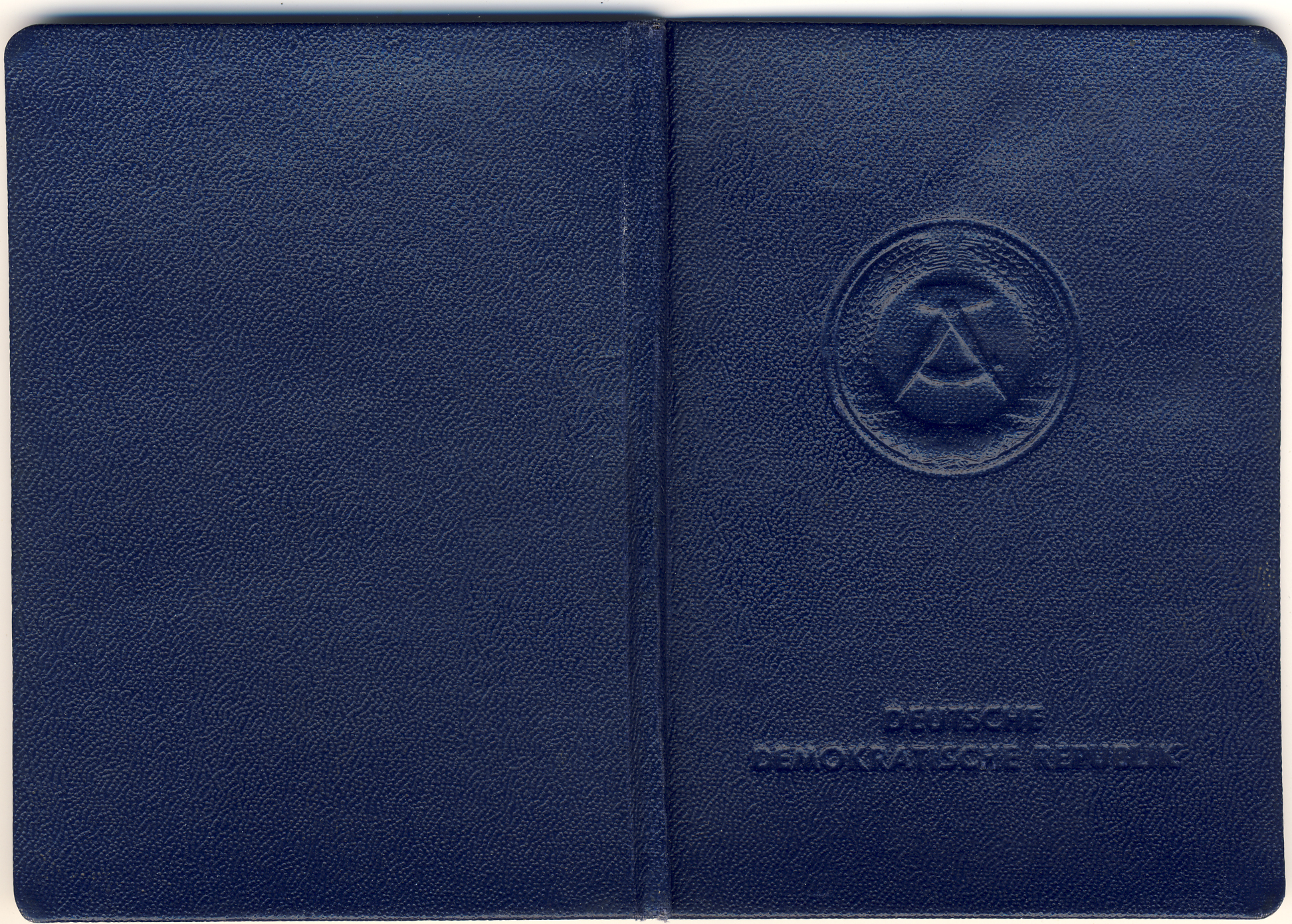

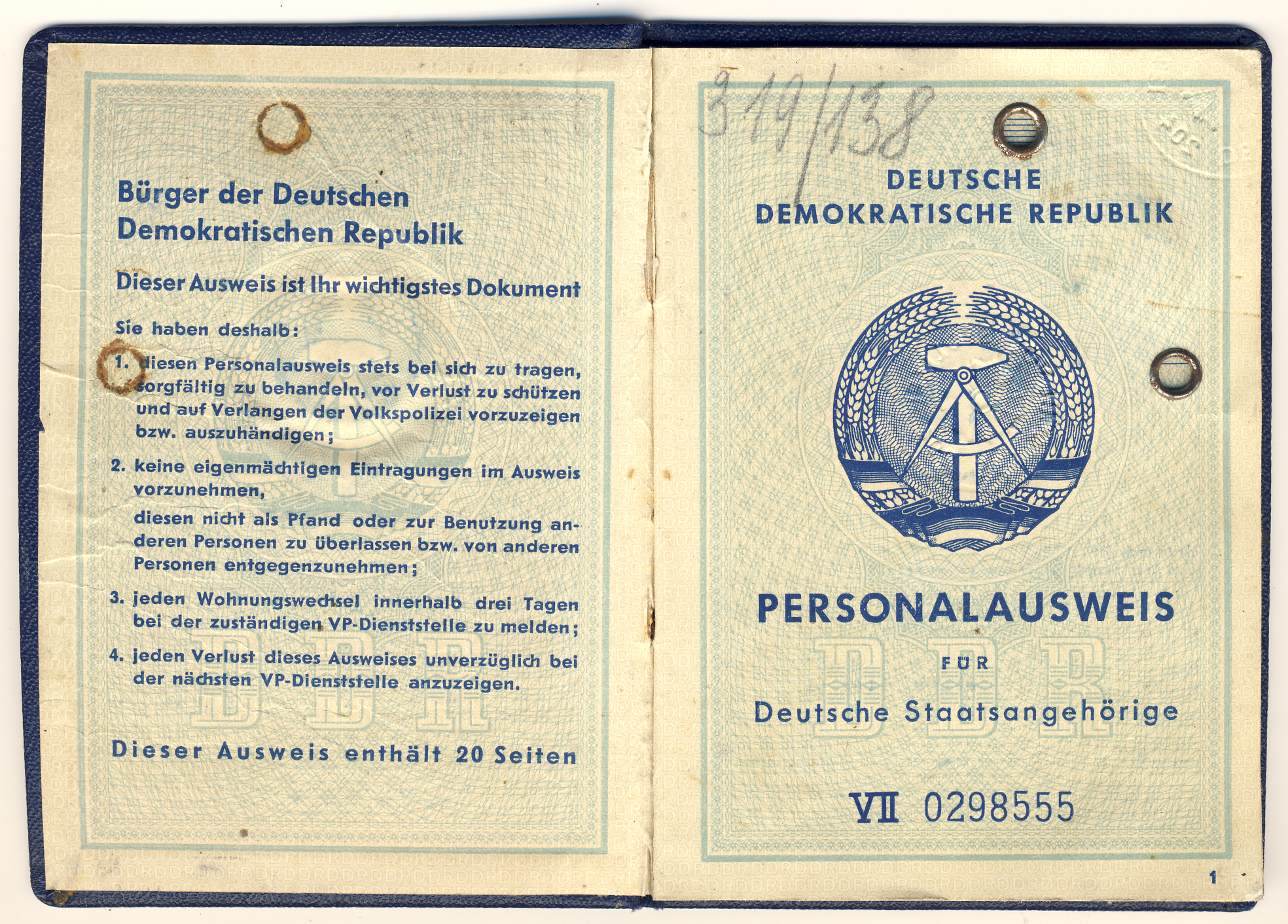

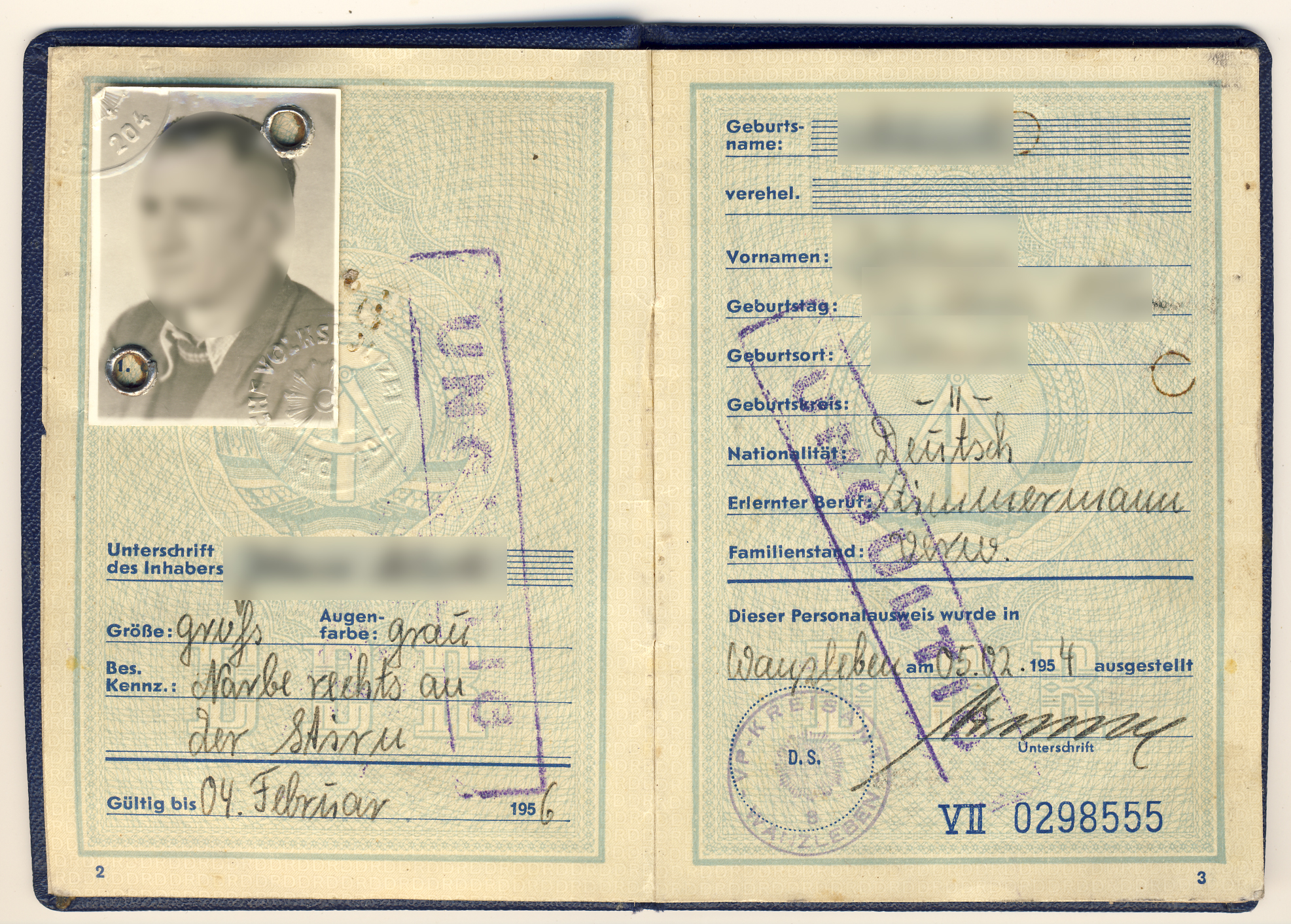

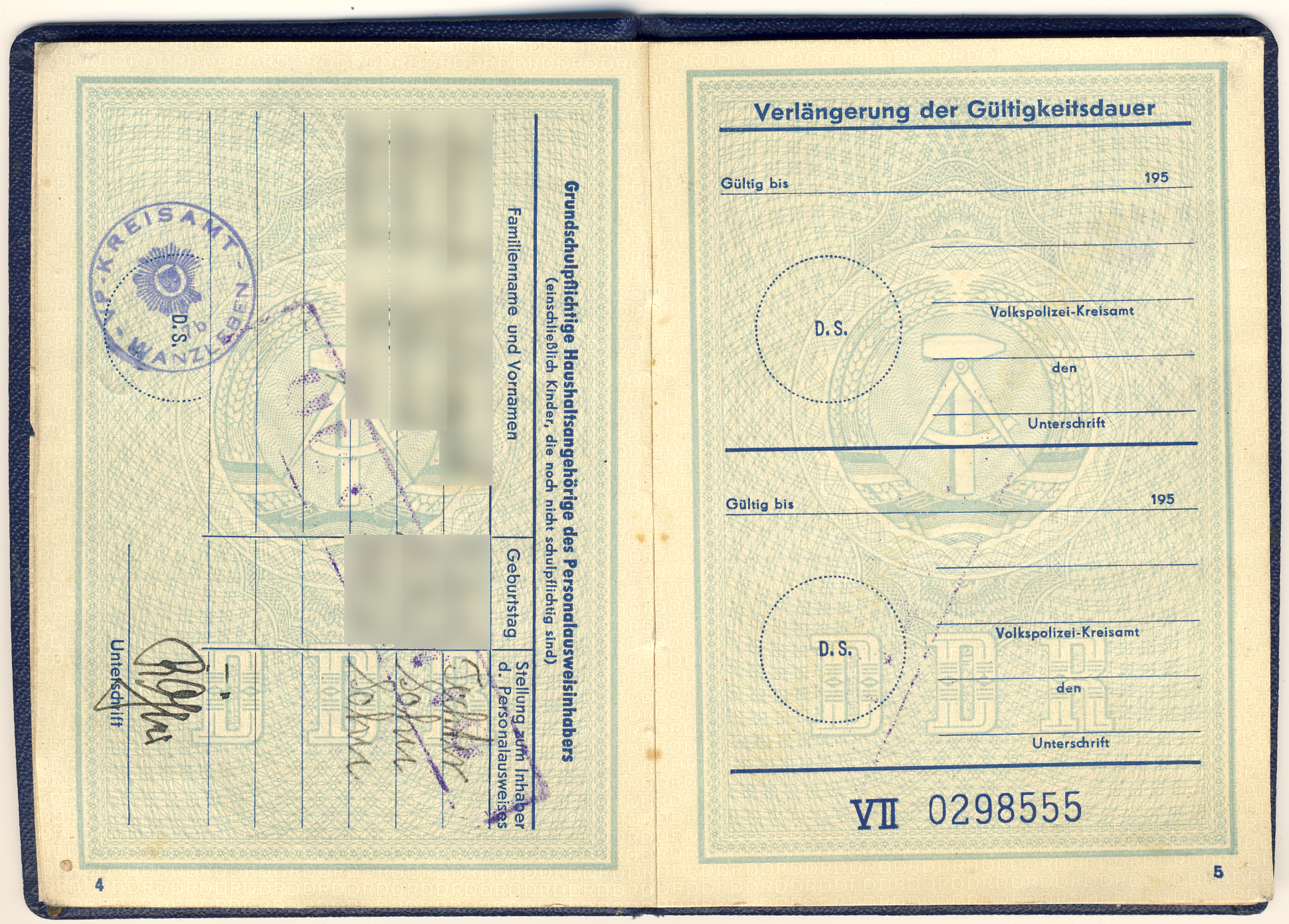

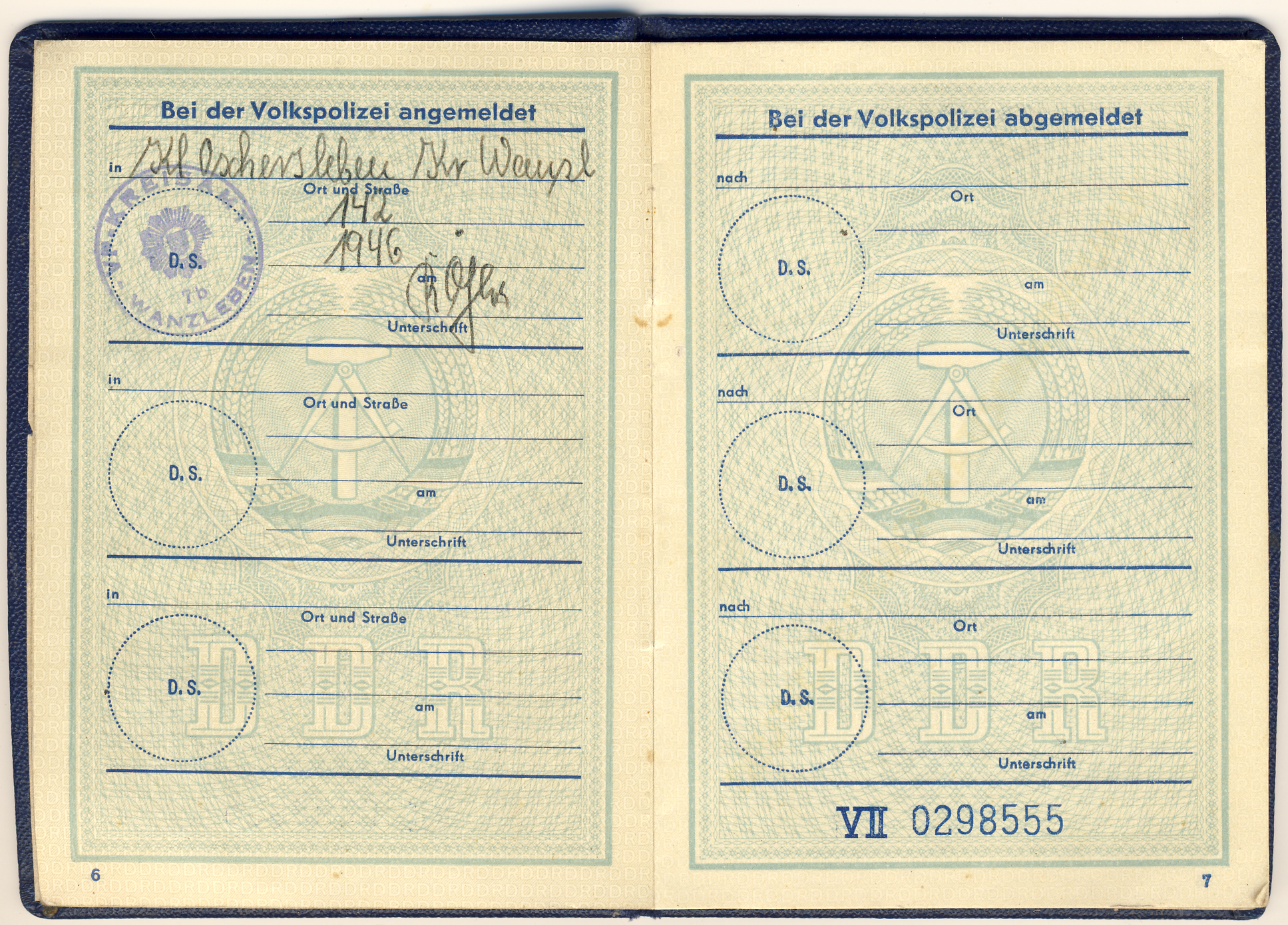

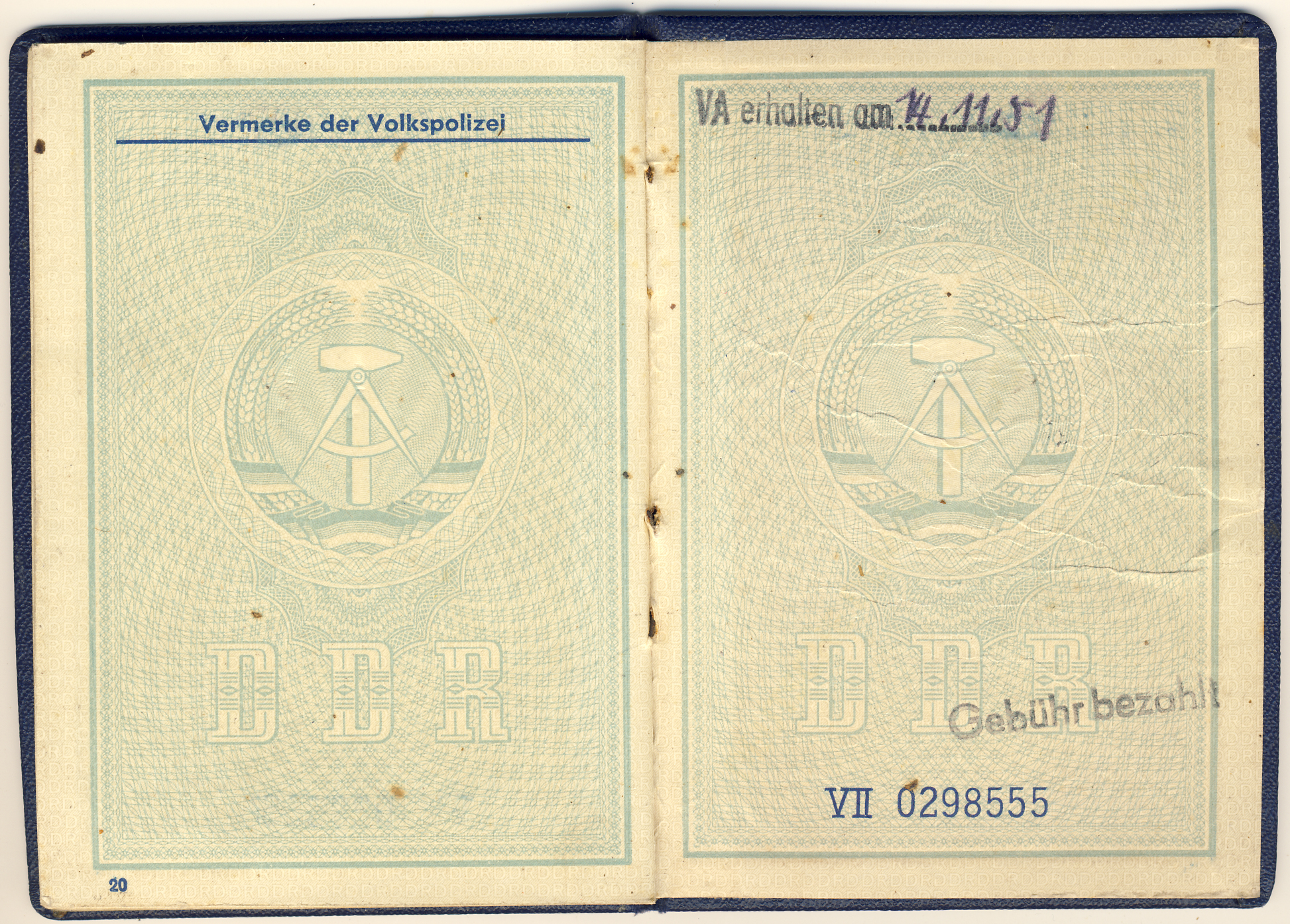

== See also ==
- German passport
- German residence permit (identity document for non-EU citizens living in Germany)
- Kennkarte (identity document used in Nazi Germany)
- National identity cards in the European Union
