= CVC =

CVC may refer to:

== Science and technology ==
- Compact Video Cassette, a quarter-inch video cassette format
- Card verification code, a security feature on credit cards
- Card Verifiable Certificate, a format for digital certificates usable by smart cards
- Central venous catheter, or central line
- Chronic venous congestion
- Citrus variegated chlorosis
- CVC theorem prover
- Current–voltage characteristic
- Conserved vector current
- Contractile vacuole complex

== Organizations ==
- Canning Vale College, in Perth, Western Australia
- Central Vigilance Commission, India
- Centro Velico Caprera, Italy
- Colonial Valley Conference, a high school athletic conference in New Jersey, US
- Comberton Village College, in Comberton, UK
- Continental Volleyball Conference, an NCAA Division III men's volleyball conference with members along the US East Coast
- Credit Valley Conservation, in Southern Ontario, Canada

=== Companies ===
- Citigroup Venture Capital Equity Partners, an U.S. based private equity firm renamed Court Square Capital Partners and spun out of Citigroup in 2006
- CVC Capital Partners, a European private equity firm
- CVC, a Brazilian travel agency
- Control Video Corporation, a short-lived venture that was a predecessor of AOL LLC (formerly America Online, Inc)
- Cablevision (New York Stock Exchange ticker symbol)
- Cleve Airport (IATA code), in South Australia

== Other uses ==
- Corporate venture capital, the investment of corporate funds directly in external startup companies
- United States Capitol Visitor Center, an underground addition to the US Capitol complex
- California Vehicle Code
- Crime Victims’ Compensation, in the US and Crime Victim Compensation and Support Authority in Sweden
- Consonant–vowel–consonant, a syllable pattern

== See also ==
- Citigroup Venture Capital (disambiguation)
- Virtual Circuit Connectivity Verification (VCCV), in pseudo-wire
