= VugaPay =

- Original authors: Patrick Muhire and Cedrick Muhoza
- Developer: Vuga Ltd
- Initial release: 2015
- Platform: iOS; Android; Web; USSD
- Website: www.vugapay.com

VugaPay is a cross-platform payment service owned by Vuga Ltd, a Rwandan company. It allows businesses and users to transfer money across major payment systems, including credit card networks, mobile money and Bitcoin via an application programming interface, unstructured supplementary service data interface, a mobile phone app, or a web interface. It processed over 5 million transactions in 2016. As of December 2016, VugaPay offers instant payments to and from 40 different mobile money networks/carriers in Rwanda, Kenya, Uganda, Niger, Malawi, Congo Democratic Republic, Ghana, Tanzania and Zambia.

== Service ==
VugaPay is a cross-platform payment service that lets businesses and users transfer money across major payment systems. It follows a similar business model to PayPal. VugaPay describes itself as a "digital wallet". Users sign up and create an account by providing basic information and bank account information using their mobile app, USSD for feature phones or on the VugaPay website and they can find others who have created an account. Friends and recipients of transactions can be found via phone number, VugaPay username, or email.

Users have a VugaPay balance that is used for their transactions. They can link their mobile money, bitcoin, PayPal bank accounts, debit cards, or credit cards to their VugaPay account. Paying with mobile money is free, but credit cards, bitcoin, PayPal and Bank accounts have a 3% fee for each transaction. If a user does not have enough funds on VugaPay itself when making a transaction, it will automatically withdraw the supplemental funds from the registered mobile money, bank account or card.

== History ==
VugaPay was founded by two Rwandan brothers, Patrick Muhire and Cedrick Muhoza. After a few years of watching M-pesa evolve from a small transfer platform into a full-blown payment solution, Patrick wondered what it might look like if it were redesigned from the ground up; purely for all countries. According to Patrick, the idea of VugaPay originated when Patrick wanted to transfer money from one mobile network operator to another. The process of sending money from one mobile network operator to another was a hassle, so they started working on a way to send money across all mobile network operators, interoperability for mobile money. Their original prototype sent money through MTN, TIGO, AIRTEL in Rwanda, but they eventually transitioned from Rwanda to the whole of East Africa, connecting telecoms in those regions. The app went public during the 2015 Transform Africa Summit (TAS) in Kigali.

Initially, VugaPay was based on mobile money. VugaPay interoperable transfers are considered a hack through mobile money carriers and can be conducted on any carrier with mobile money services. These transfers are instant, with a large number of carriers from Africa. The East African reports some Confidence trick exploit this on mobile money systems and other services.

In late 2016, Timothy C. Draper made his second-African investment in VugaPay. VugaPay later introduced an open source mobile money api, for merchants who would accept mobile money as payment.

== See also ==
- Mobile payment
- mobile money
- M-pesa
- Bitcoin
- PayPal
