= Selina Wamucii =

Agricultural company

- Type: Private
- Industry: Agriculture
- Founded: 2015
- Founder: John Oroko, Kariuki Gaita
- Headquarters: Nairobi, Kenya
- Area served: Kenya; Ethiopia; Uganda; Tanzania; Rwanda; Mozambique; Madagascar
- Key people: John Oroko (CEO), Kariuki Gaita
- Products: Fruits and Vegetables; Grains and Pulses; Tea; Coffee; Nuts and Oilseeds; Spices; Fish and Seafood; Fibre and Textiles
- Website: www.selinawamucii.com

Selina Wamucii (| səˈliːnə wæˈmuːʃɪɘ |) is an agricultural company and social enterprise that markets produce from smallholder farmers by integrating with cooperatives, producer organizations, agro-processors, small and medium enterprises, and other organizations that work directly with family farmers. It uses technology to manage the produce grown by smallholder farmers. The company's headquarters are located in Nairobi and is best known as Kenya's largest exporter of avocado.

== Overview ==
Selina Wamucii's story began with two women farmers named Selina Nyanchoka and Esther Wamucii Gaita, mothers of the founders John Oroko and Kariuki Gaita. Selina Wamucii markets produce including mango and avocado from thousands of smallholder farmers in Africa. Farmers join Selina Wamucii either on the Selina Web-based platform named Growersoft or on mobile phone via USSD. The "Selina Wamucii Farmers" program provides all necessary information about farms during the produce growth period. Then, financial transactions are carried out between the company and farmers through the M-Pesa, mobile banking system. Selina Wamucii links thousands of smallholder farmers to buyers including wholesalers, retailers, vendors and restaurants.

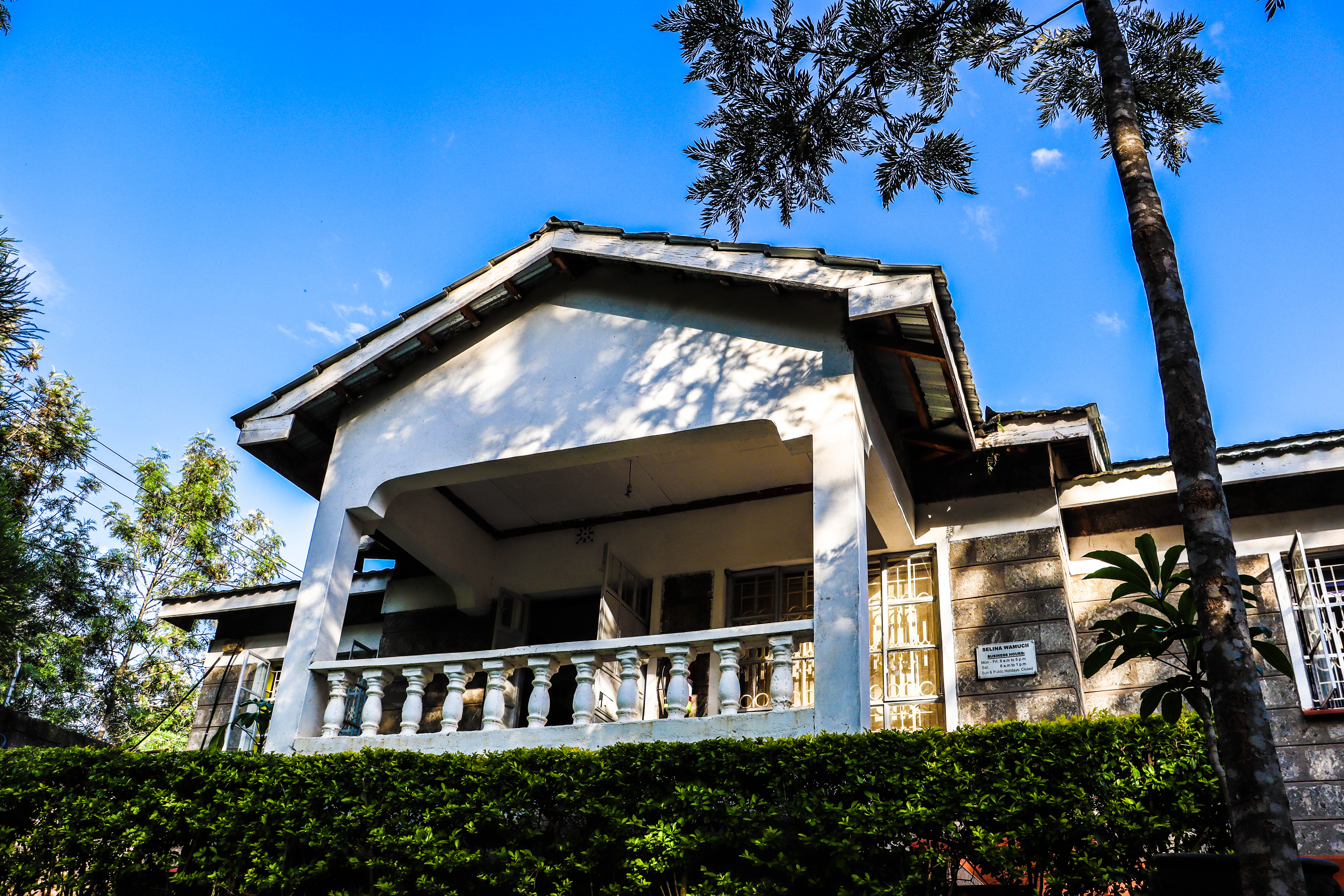
Selina Wamucii headquarters in Nairobi, Kenya

== Work with Farmers ==
=== Farmer Groups and Cooperatives ===
In March 2020, the company announced that it was opening up its market access platform to Africa's farmer groups and cooperatives.

=== Call for an International Coffee Agreement ===
Selina Wamucii has been involved in voicing the challenges of Africa's smallholder farmers. In July 2020, the company released a report that highlighted the situation of Africa's coffee farmers, indicating that the farmers are not receiving a fair share of the billions that the coffee industry makes every year. The report concluded that Africa's Coffee Farmers lose billions annually due to the poor prices they receive for their coffee.

The company's CEO's called for the establishment of a quota-based, International Coffee Agreement that sets export quotas and helps steer the price, and makes it possible for farmers to live from the proceeds of their hard work.

=== Fight Against Locusts ===
In January 2021, Selina Wamucii launched an AI-powered early warning tool to help farmers fight off locusts that were devastating crops and livelihoods across Africa.

The tool known as Kuzi, derived from the Swahili name for the wattled starling, a bird that eats locusts, relies on satellite data, sensors that monitor soil moisture, and local weather data to deliver predictions on locust breeding locations and migration routes.

== Awards and recognition ==
Selina Wamucii has received recognition from various institutions including the London Stock Exchange Companies to Inspire Africa 2019, global social impact programme Expo Live, run by Expo 2020 – organisers of the next World Expo, and the TOMMY HILFIGER Social Innovation Challenge.
