= Kennkarte =

Identity document of Nazi Germany

The Kennkarte served as the basic identification document issued to German nationals from the age of 15 onwards, with place of residence or permanent residence in the territory of Germany during the Third Reich era, and extended to include citizens of German-occupied territories. It was introduced through the ordinance on identity cards of July 22, 1938 (RGBl. I p. 913) as a "police-issued general domestic identity card".

== Introduction of the identity card ==
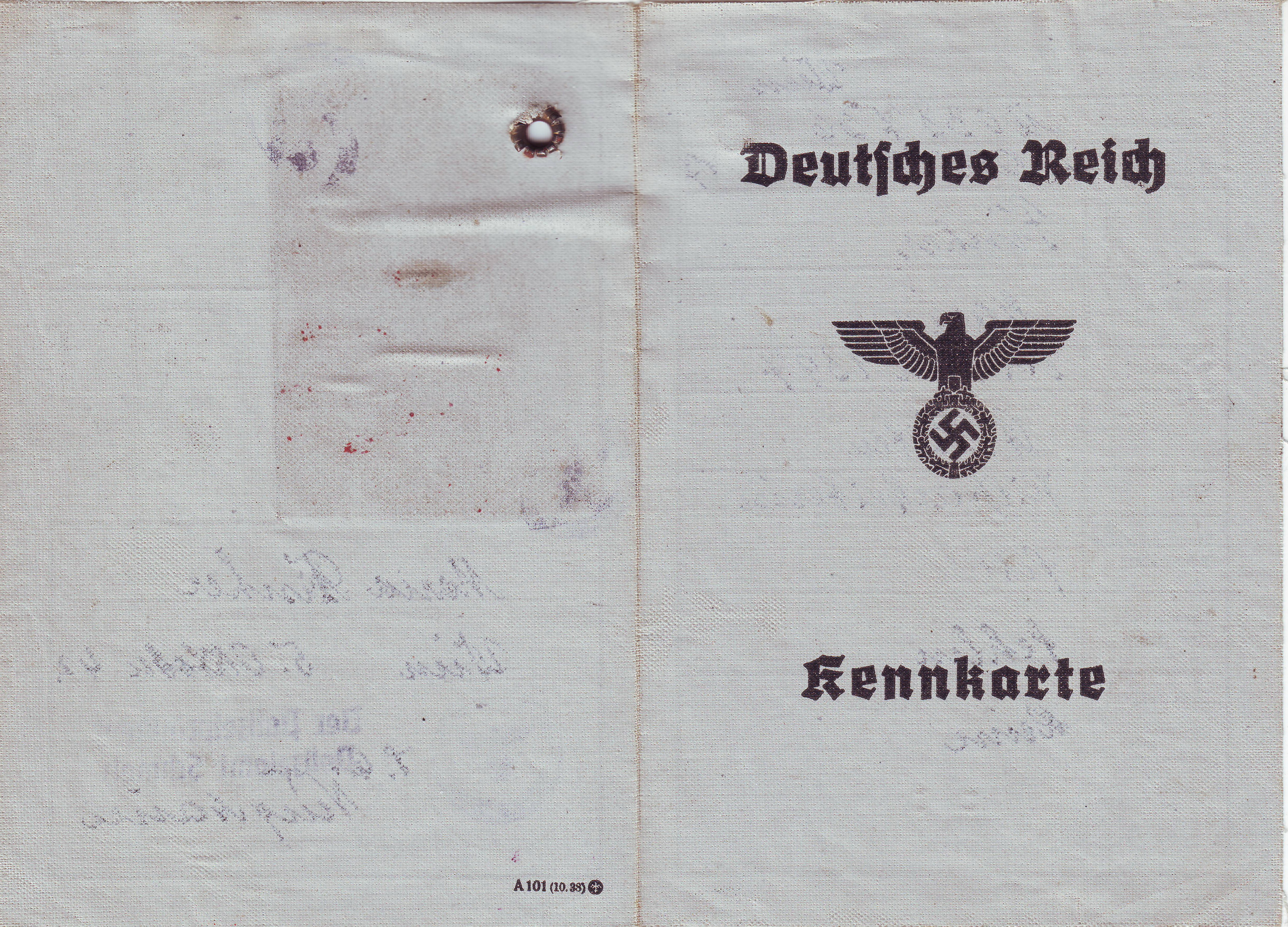
Deutsches Reich Kennkarte with the Reichsadler national emblem: exterior view, issued to German citizens.

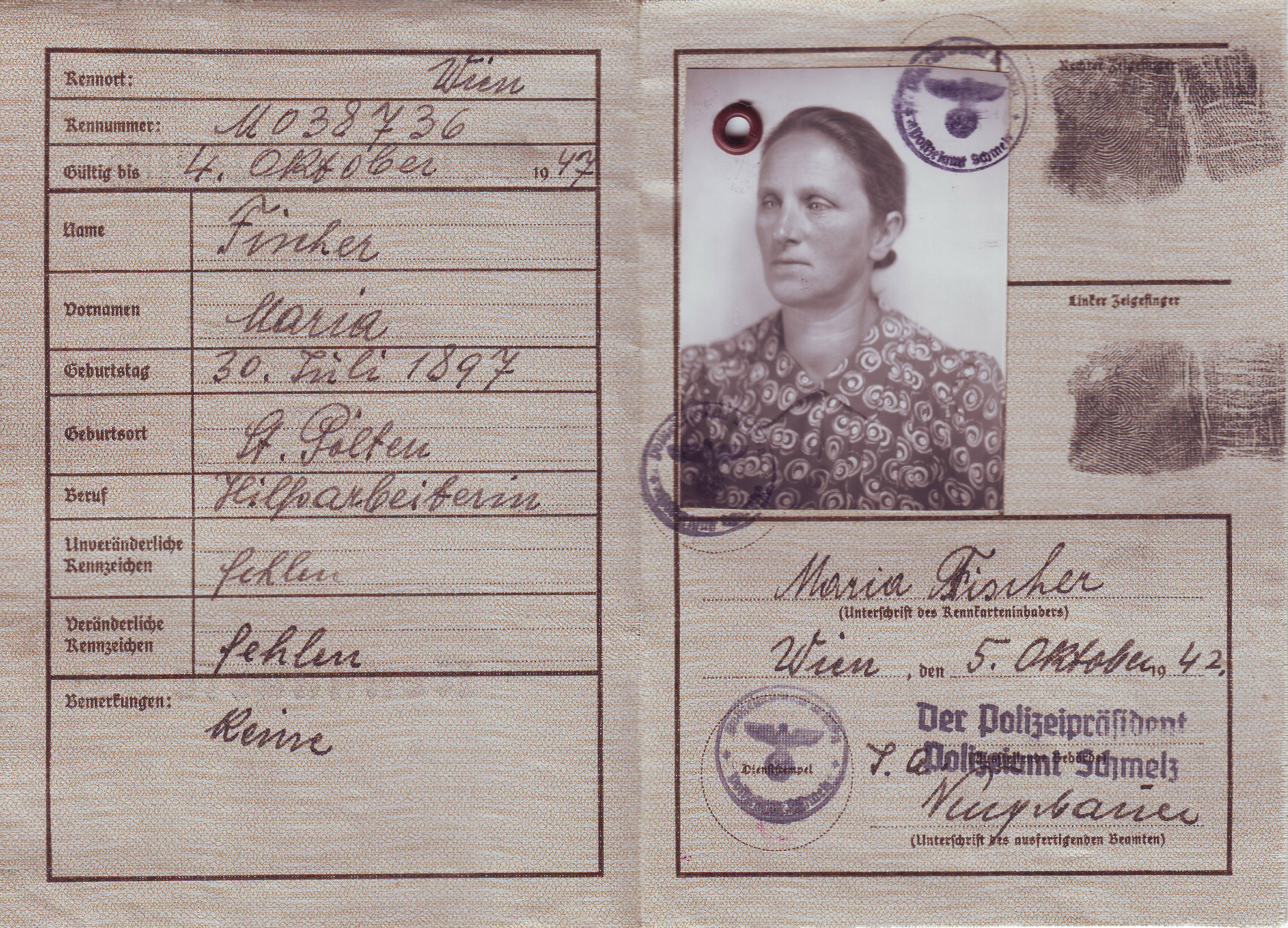
Deutsches Reich Kennkarte: of the Trotskyism resistance fighter Maria Fischer, issued in annexed Vienne 5 October 1942, interior view.

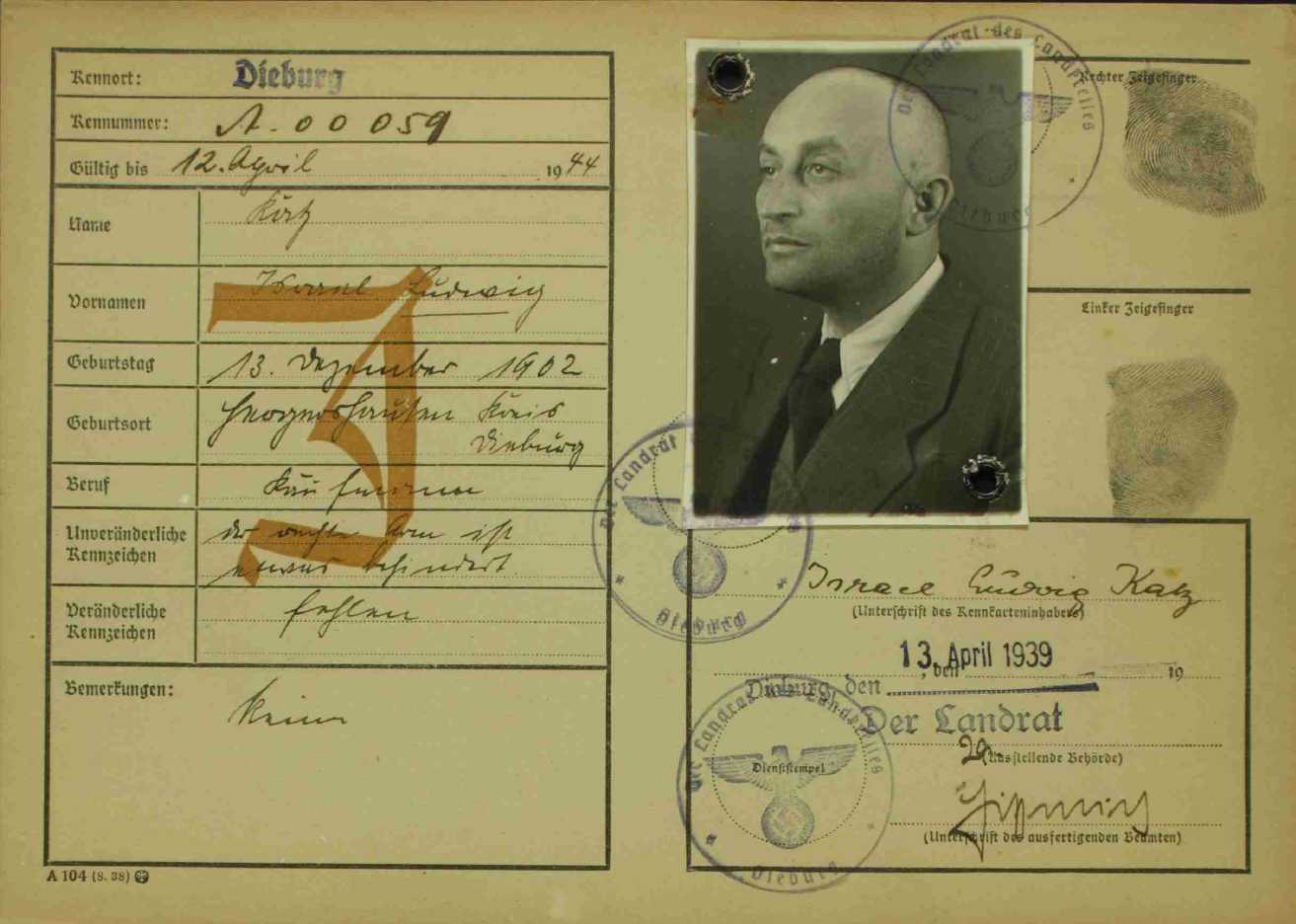
Kennkarte of [Israel] Ludwig Katz (the name Israel added to the forename), issued 13 April 1939, interior view. The prominent 'J' imprint indicates Jewish. Ludwig Katz was murdered in Auschwitz concentration camp on 14 September 1943.

=== Identification card requirement ===
Following the introduction in Germany of the Kennkarte (identification card), three announcements specified details such as the obligation for certain groups to apply for the identity card by year-end. The ordinance took effect on October 1, 1938, and evidence suggests that the first identity cards were issued starting in January 1939. These cards remained valid for five years from the date of issue.

The regulation authorized the Reich Minister of the Interior to introduce the requirement to have identity cards for certain groups of citizens. Based on this authorization, three announcements dated July 23, 1938 (RGBl. I p. 921 ff.) introduced an obligation to have identity cards for:

- male German citizens within three months of turning 18 (entry into compulsory military service) and those conscripted into service,
- German citizens over 15 years of age when applying for ID cards for "local border traffic" and
- all Jewish citizens as defined in the "First Ordinance of the Reich Citizenship Law" (Reichsbürgergesetz)

For the latter, the third announcement contained a series of additional regulations:

- Jews had to indicate their non-Aryan descent when applying,
- Jewish children also had to have an identity card,
- after reaching the age of 15, Jews had to identify themselves with an identity card at all times upon official request,
- Jews had to always indicate their Jewish status in official dealings and present their identity card,
- the administrative fee for issuing identity cards to Jews was not reduced and amounted to 3 ℛℳ.

=== Addition to forenames of Jewish citizens ===
On August 17, 1938, the German government issued the Second Ordinance implementing the Law on the Change of Surnames and First Names (Namensänderungsverordnung, RGBl. I, 1044). Starting in January 1939 at the latest, this decree required all Jewish men and boys to add "Israel" to their first names, while Jewish women and girls were required to add "Sara". This rule applied only if their original first name were not on the Third Reich's list of state-approved names for Jews. The law specifically targeted assimilated Jews who had adopted names considered "less apparently Jewish" by the Nazis, as they viewed this practice as an attempt to conceal Jewish identity. These measures were recorded by the municipal registration authorities (Meldebehörden) or police headquarters (Polizeipräsidien) in the contemporary residents' registers.

== Implementation ==
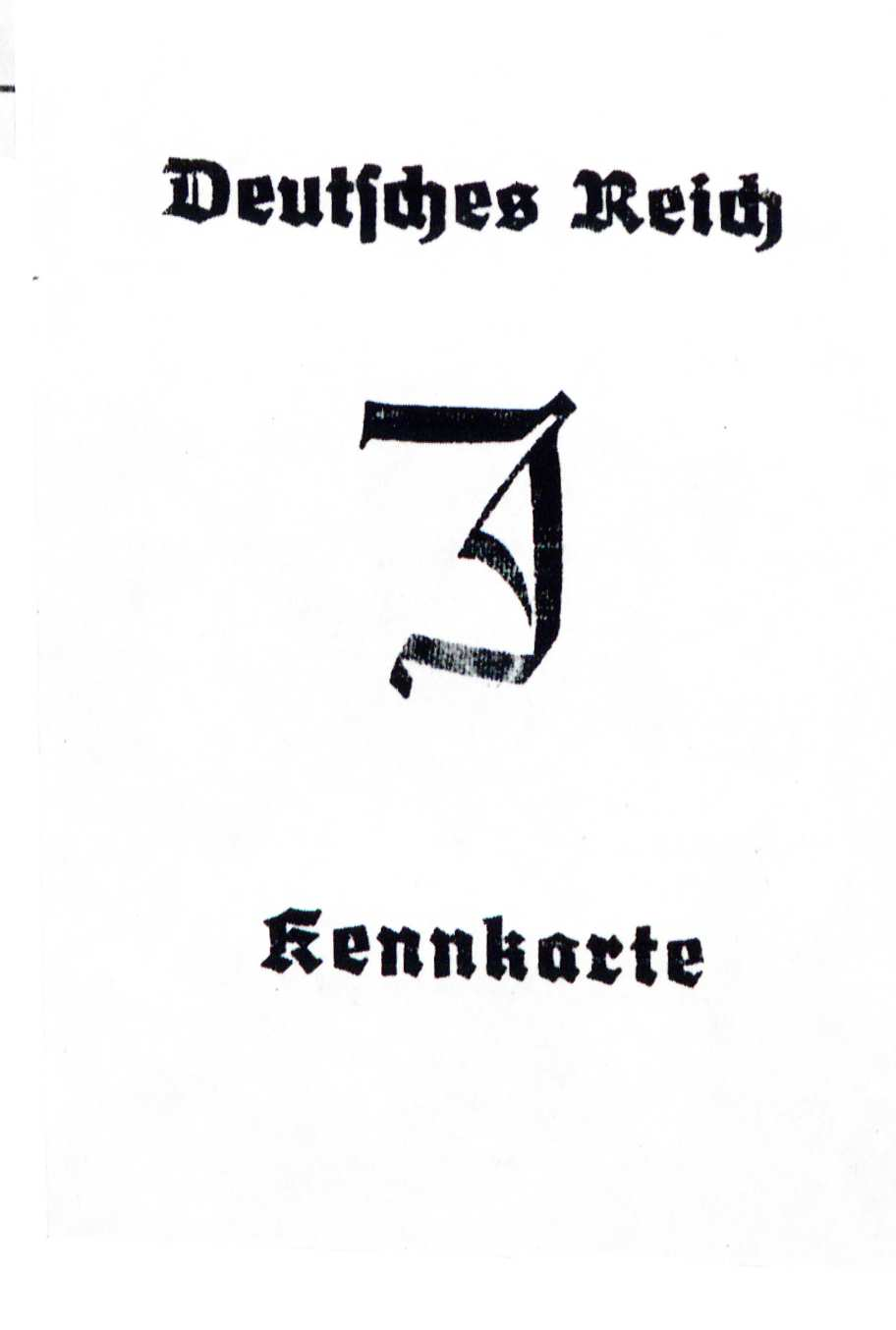
Deutsches Reich Kennkarte, facsimile of the front cover issued to Jewish citizens

The local police authorities were responsible for receiving the applications, and the passport authorities were responsible for issuing the Kennkarte. The identity cards were issued in duplicate; one copy remained with the issuing authority. The administrative fee for issuing them was 3 ℛℳ.; in certain cases – particularly when identity cards were compulsory – it could be reduced to as little as 1 ℛℳ. or waived entirely.

The identity cards were DIN A6 format and made initially of grey, linen-reinforced paper. In addition to the identification location and number, they contained registration and description data (surname, first name, date of birth, place of birth, occupation, fixed and changeable distinguishing marks), photograph, and prints of the holder's index fingers, the place and date of issue, the name of the issuing authority and the signature of the issuing official. The expiry date of five-year validity was also noted. Proof of payment of the fee was provided either by an adhesive revenue stamp or ink stamp.

The Kennkarte identity cards issued specifically to Jewish citizens displayed a prominent black 'J' on the front cover instead of the national emblem (Reichsadler), and a reddish-brown, five-centimeter-high 'J' was pre-printed on the interior.

From the identity card collection of the Jewish Community Frankfurt am Main and others, it is clear that identity cards for Jewish citizens were issued and handed out at the earliest in early January 1939. The issue dragged on until at least August 1939.

== Onset of World War II ==
At the onset of the Second World War, a regulation issued on September 10, 1939, in the Reichsgesetzblatt, mandated compulsory identification in the territory of Germany (Reichsgebiet) for all German citizens over the age of 15. This requirement also applied to citizens of the Protectorate of Bohemia and Moravia, and upon official demand, all individuals were obligated to identify themselves using official photo ID.

== Post-war period ==
After the end of the Second World War, the Identification law in post-war Germany was changed by the Allied Control Council through laws and orders by the Allied-occupied military governments. First, the racially discriminatory regulations were eliminated.

The validity of the Kennkarte was initially extended, and their use persisted. On these post-war documents, the swastika within the national emblem (Reichsadler, imperial eagle with swastika) was specifically obscured with ink. A sticker, ink-stamp, or handwritten notarization was also applied that contained the text "Dieser Ausweis behält vorläufig seine Gültigkeit" (This ID card remains provisionally valid), along with the date, signature, and ink-stamp of the authenticating and authorizing authority. The compulsory forenames of "Israel" and "Sara" included in the identity cards issued to Jewish citizens were also struck out with red ink.

Since the Basic Law for the Federal Republic of Germany came into force on May 23, 1949, the Federal Government became responsible for the registration and issue of ID cards in the newly established Federal Republic of Germany (at the time commonly known as West Germany). The Federal Law on Identity Cards of 1951 and the implementing laws of the states of Germany were issued on this basis. It was only as a result of these laws that the Kennkarte was finally replaced by the new Personalausweis (Identity card). The word "Kennkarte", however, continued to be used by some older people for the identity card.

Where duplicates of the Kennkarte identity cards deposited with the local authorities have survived to this day, they are often the only way to find portrait photos of victims of the Holocaust.

== German occupied countries ==
=== Poland ===
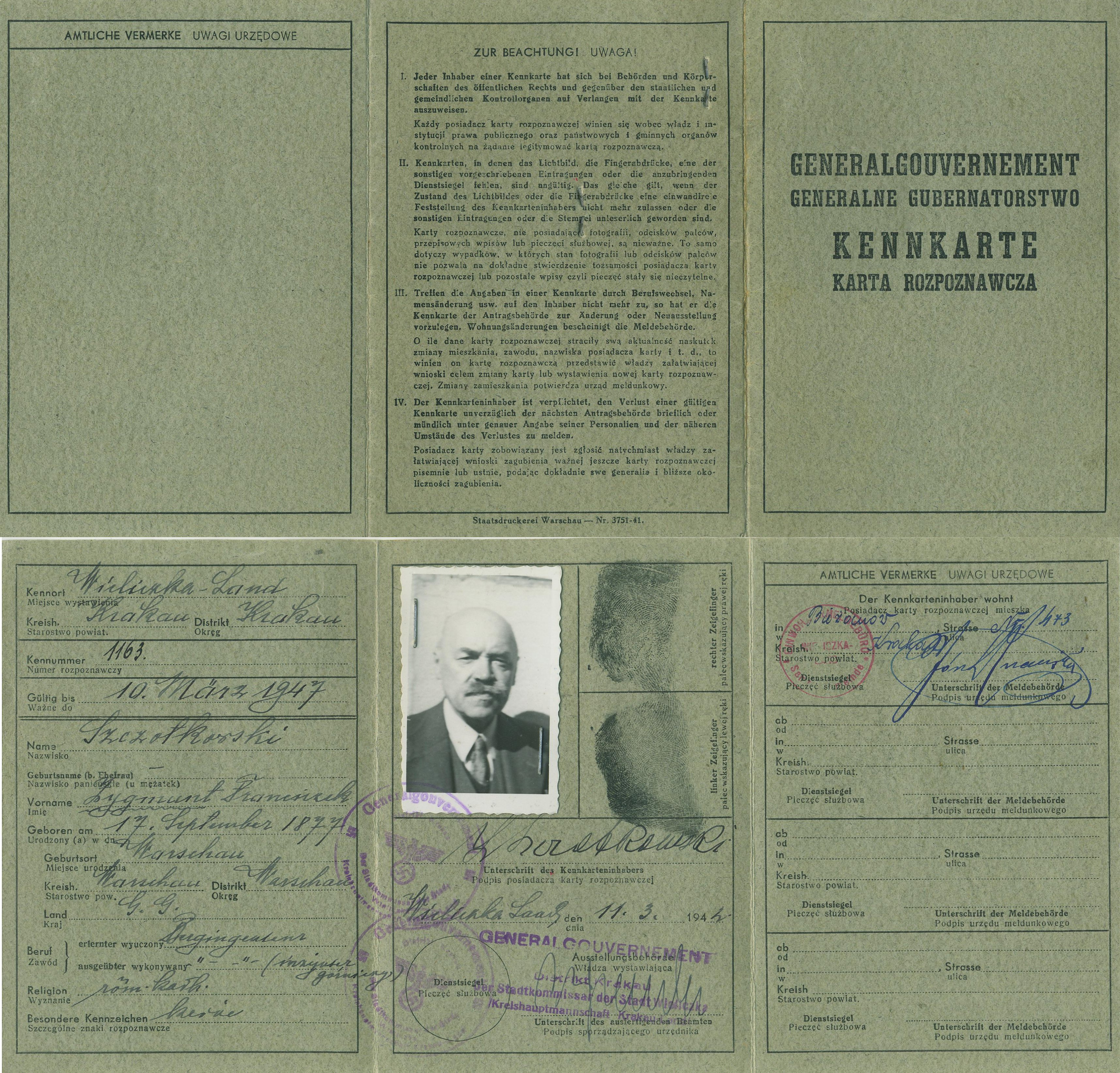
Kennkarte issued by German authorities to a Polish citizen of the General Government.

After World War II began, Nazi Germany introduced the Kennkarte for citizens of occupied countries, including occupied Poland (General Governorate for the Occupied Polish Region). These identification cards were issued to residents aged 15 and above between 1941 and 1943. However, due to resistance efforts, many Kennkarten were forged by the Polish resistance.

In the first weeks of the German occupation of Poland, pre-war documents issued by the Second Polish Republic were used for identification. On 26 October 1939, following a decree of Hans Frank, Kennkarten was announced. Due to legal arguments, the first cards were not issued until June 1941. German authorities continued to issue them until 1943. A Kennkarte was a sheet of thin cardboard, measuring about 30 by 14 cm (12 x 5.5 inches). It had two parallel folds, and text on both sides, making it a six-page document, with each page measuring 10 by 14 cm (5.5 x 4 inches). The color of a Kennkarte was based on ethnicity. Poles had gray ones; Jews and Romas, yellow; Russians, Ukrainians, Belarusians, Georgians, and Goralenvolk, blue. Furthermore, letters were introduced to mark each ethnicity, based on the initial letter of the German word for the ethnicity (Juden, Weissrussen, Zigeuner etc) – J for Jews, U for Ukrainians, R for Russians, W for Belarusians, K for Georgians, G for Goralenvolk, Z for Roma (Gypsies).

To receive a Kennkarte, an applicant had to fill out an application, and provide such documents as a birth certificate, pre-war Polish ID, and marriage certificate (in specified cases). Polish citizens of appropriate ethnicity were obliged to make a formal declaration that they belonged to the Aryan race. Upon receiving the card, applicants were fingerprinted. Since Polish-speaking civil servants were involved in the process, the cards were frequently forged, which allowed for members of the Home Army, and Polish Jews, to obtain a new identity. Furthermore, illegal printing shops manufacturing the Kennkarten operated in occupied Poland. The cards were available on the black market, for the price of 500 zlotys. According to the Gestapo, in 1943 in Warsaw there were up to 150,000 fake cards in circulation. The Home Army estimated that in late 1942, some 10% of residents of the General Government had fake Kennkarten.

Other important documents in Nazi-occupied Poland included:

- Ausweis, Arbeitskarte, Bescheinigung – issued by the workplace
- Erlaubniskarte – issued for entertainment workers (actors, etc.)
