= Hauptwohnsitz =

German term for a primary residence

In German-speaking countries, Hauptwohnsitz (English: Main domicile) denotes the primary place of residence. In Germany and Austria, the concept of Hauptwohnsitz has special legal ramifications, primarily involving tax.

In Austria the Hauptwohnsitz has an important meaning in the context of financial adjustment between the federation and the local municipalities. On the basis of the census determined number of inhabitants with Hauptwohnsitz, the municipality receives its budget from the federal government. Hauptwohnsitze count themselves for a municipality in two regards: By the direct payment per head, and an increase in premiums after exceeding certain thresholds for the number of inhabitants. This leads to frequent censuses to match the budget of a municipality to its number of inhabitants. In fact, many municipalities are negatively affected by this system. The city of Graz, Austria's second largest city, counts about 300,000 registered Hauptwohnsitze, however, almost 340,000 people do have their main residence there, as there are many students still having their Hauptwohnsitz registered in their hometowns. Since those are not taken into account concerning fiscal distribution, Graz faces serious economic problems. Currently there are campaigns trying to motivate students having their Hauptwohnsitz registered there.

The Hauptwohnsitz in Germany is based on the main center of ones' interest (Lebensmittelpunkt). The Hauptwohnsitz is also the place in which one exercises the right to vote, and where the municipal administration issues a citizen's ID card and passport. The income tax revenue is split between the federal government, the Land government and the municipality where the respective taxpayer has their Hauptwohnsitz. Apart from the Hauptwohnsitz a person can establish multiple secondary places of residence (Nebenwohnsitze, sg. Nebenwohnsitz) where they are also registered as residents but do not have a right to vote. A number of German municipalities impose a secondary-residence tax (Zweitwohnungssteuer) on persons having such a secondary residence, the rationale for that being that they have to provide services to these persons but do not share in their income tax.

On the other hand, the cost of a secondary residence (including the secondary-residence tax) for employment purposes is tax decuctible.

== See also ==
- Domicile (law)
- tax residence
- legal residence
