= Citigroup Venture Capital =

Citigroup Venture Capital may refer to:

- Citigroup Venture Capital Equity Partners, a US based private equity firm renamed Court Square Capital Partners and spun out of Citigroup in 2006
- CVC Capital Partners, a European private equity firm
