= Card Verifiable Certificate =

Card Verifiable Certificates (CVC) are digital certificates that are designed to be processed by devices with limited computing power such as smart cards. This is achieved by using simple type–length–value (TLV) encoding with fixed fields. Fixed fields mean that each field in the certificate is of fixed, or maximum, length and each field comes in a well defined order. This makes parsing easy, in contrast to asn.1 parsing which requires more processing and has to keep fields in memory while parsing nested content.

CVC is used by the third generation ePassports implementing Extended Access Control (EAC).

There are open source implementations for processing EAC/CVC certificates:

- EJBCA
- JMRTD
