= Security hologram =

Security label

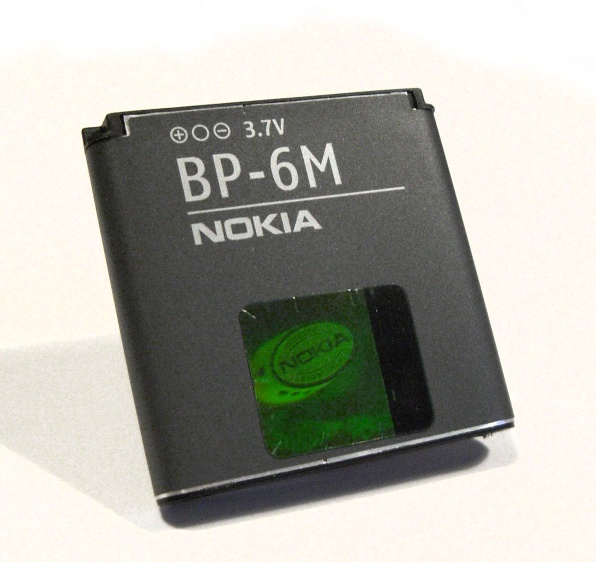
A hologram on a Nokia mobile phone battery. This is intended to show the battery is 'original Nokia' and not a cheaper imitation.

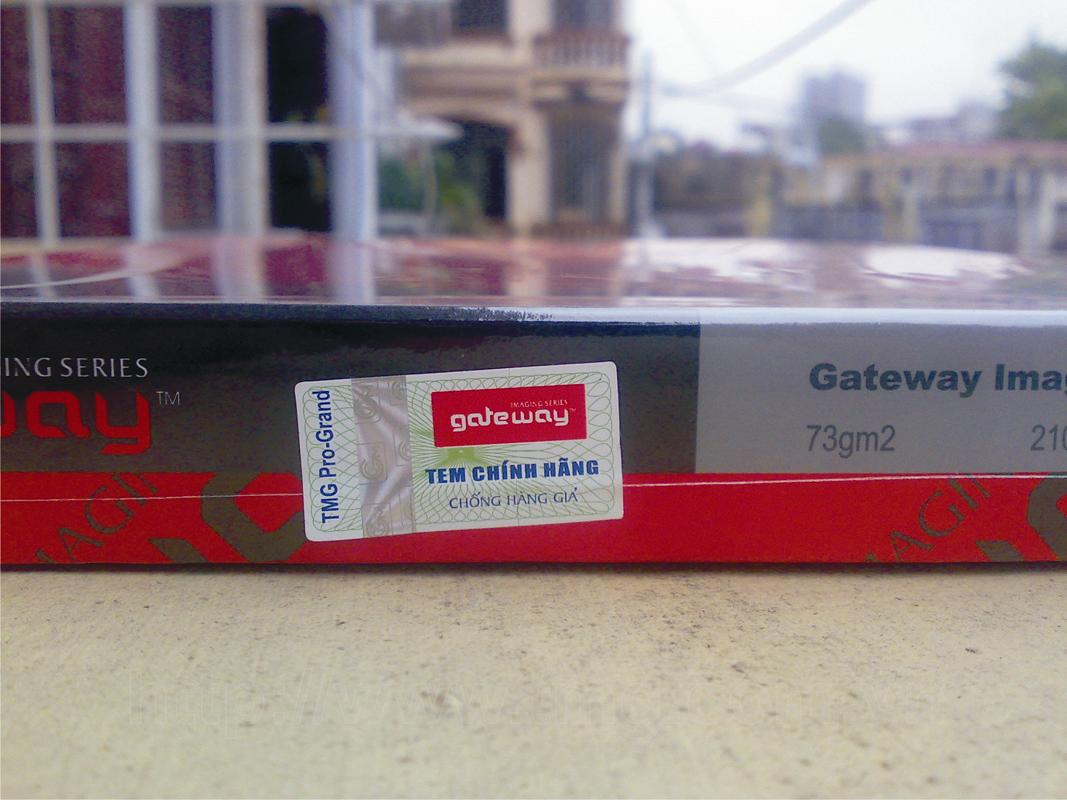
A hologram label on a paper box for security

Security holograms are labels with a hologram printed onto it for sale security reasons.

It is argued by the International Hologram Manufacturers Association that holograms on security labels are difficult to forge because they are replicated from a master hologram which requires expensive specialized and technologically advanced equipment. However, security holograms have also been criticised for their ineffectiveness, because equipment for manufacturing holograms has become significantly easier to access, and because few people have the expertise and equipment to authenticate them accurately.

Security holograms are used widely in several banknotes around the world, in particular those that are of high denominations. They are also used in passports, credit and bank cards as well as quality products.

Holograms are classified into different types with reference to the degree of level of optical security incorporated in them during the process of master origination. The different classifications are described below:

== 2D / 3D "hologram" images ==
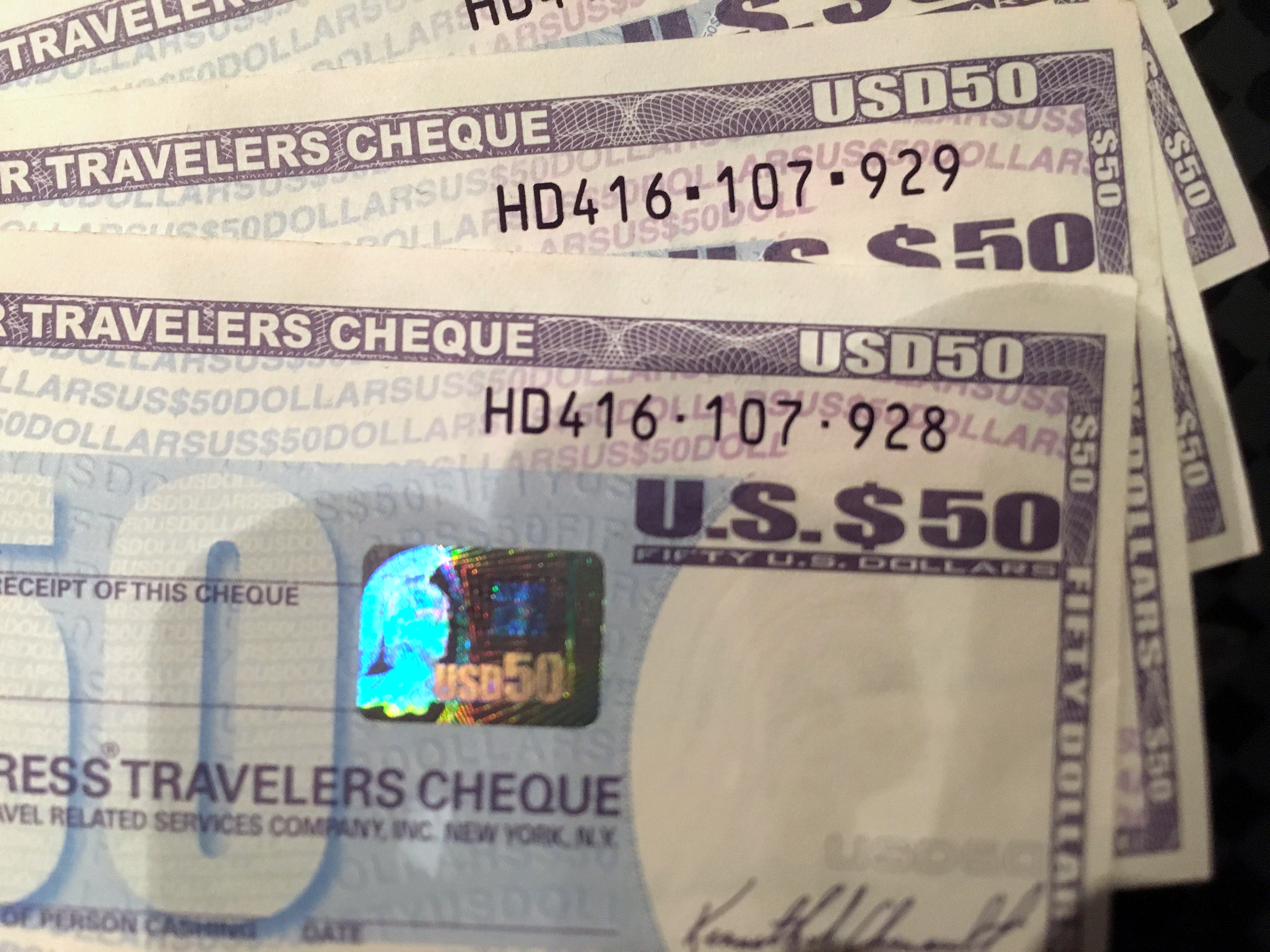
Hologram image against counterfeit on a traveller's cheque from American Express, c. 2012. The image has one of the company's logos on it, a Roman Centurion.

These are by far the most common type of hologram – and in fact they are not holograms in any true sense of the words. The term "hologram" has taken on a secondary meaning due to the widespread use of a multi-layer image on credit cards and driver licenses. This type of "hologram" consists of two or more images stacked in such a way that each is alternately visible depending upon the angle of perspective of the viewer. The technology here is similar to the technology used for the past 50 years to make red safety night reflectors for bicycles, trucks, and cars.

These holograms (and therefore the artwork of these holograms) may be of two layers (i.e. with a background and a foreground) or three layers (with a background, a middle ground and a foreground). In the case of the two-layer holograms, the matter of the middle ground is usually superimposed over the matter of the background of the hologram. These holograms display a unique multilevel, multi-color effect. These images have one or two levels of flat graphics “floating” above or at the surface of the hologram. The matter in the background appears to be under or behind the hologram, giving the illusion of depth.

== Dot matrix ==
These holograms have a maximum resolution of 10 micrometers per optical element and are produced on specialized machines making forgery very difficult and expensive. To design various optical elements, several algorithms are used to shape scattered radiation patterns.

== Flip flop ==
Flip-flop hologram master origination is a technique used to produce holograms that display flip-flop effect. They are produced with a 2D/3D master shooting system. This two channel effect of 2D/3D holograms displays two different images from different angles. These holograms are often fabricated using metalized polyester or polyvinyl chloride. The final master obtained from this flip-flop mastering technique are used to manufacture holograms which gives flip-flop effects. Producers of Flip-flop holograms often strive to use the perfect blend of 2D and 3D images to create enticing holographic images.

== Electron-beam lithography ==
These types of holograms are created using highly sophisticated and very expensive electron-beam lithography systems. This kind of technology allows the creation of surface holograms with a resolution of up to 0.1 micrometers (254,000 dpi). This technique requires development of various algorithms for designing optical elements that shapes scattered radiation patterns. This type of hologram offers features like the viewing of four lasers at a single point, 2D/3D raster text, switch effects, 3D effects, concealed images, laser readable text and true color images.

The various kinds of features possible in security holograms are mentioned below:

=== Concealed images ===
These usually take the form of very thin lines and contours. Concealed images can be seen at large angle light diffraction, and at one particular angle only.

=== Guilloché patterns (high resolution line patterns) ===
These are sets of thin lines of a complicated geometry (guilloché patterns) drawn with high resolution. The technology allows continuous visual changes of color along each separated lines.

=== Kinetic images ===
They can be seen when the conditions of hologram observations are being changed. Turning or inclining the hologram allows the movements of certain features of the image to be studied.

=== Microtexts or nanotexts ===
Dot matrix holograms are capable of embedding microtext at various sizes. There are three types of microtexts in holograms: high contrast microtexts of size 50 – 150 micrometres; diffractive grating filled microtexts of size 50 – 150 micrometres low contrast microtexts. Microtexts of sizes smaller than 50 micrometres are referred to as nanotext. Nanotext with sizes of less than 50 micrometres can be observed with a microscope only.

=== Covert laser readable images ===
Dot matrix holograms also support covert laser readable (CLR) imagery, where a simple laser device may be used to verify the hologram's authenticity. Computing CLR images is a complicated mathematical task that involves solving ill-posed problems. There are two types of CLR: Dynamic CLR and Multigrade CLR. Dynamic CLR is a set of CLR fragments that produce animated images on the screen as the control device moves along the hologram surface. Multigrade CLR images produce certain images on the screen of the controlling device, which differ in the first and minus first orders of laser light diffraction. As a variant, a hidden image which is both negative and positive, in plus one and minus one order respectively, may be created.

More recently, novel computer-generated holograms have been proposed working with structured light carrying phase singularities. Such optical elements further improve the security level, since the encoded information only appears when the input illumination is endowed with the correct intensity and phase distribution.

=== Computer-synthesized 2D/3D and 3D images ===
This technology allows 2D / 3D images to be combined with other security features (microtexts, concealed images, CLR etc.) This combination effect cannot be achieved using any other traditional technologies of origination. 2D/3D hologram masters are developed in 2D/3D master shooting lab that incorporates highly sensitive machines and advanced equipment such as microprocessor-controlled automatic positioning equipment, optical table, He-Cd laser, laser power controller, silver coatings and other related technologies. The final master obtained from 2D/3D mastering is used to manufacture 2D/3D hologram stickers. These stickers consist of a multitude of two-dimensional layers with images placed one behind the other thereby offering excellent depth. These stickers are colorful images with 3D depth between different layers.

=== True color images ===
True color images are decorative pictures. When synthesized by a computer, they may include microtexts, hidden images, and other security features, creating holograms. True Color hologram masters can be produced using 2D/3D master shooting system. The final master obtained from this mastering technique comprises true photographic images (eg:) people, animals, flags, etc. This type of holograms can't be duplicated if in case they can't obtain the original photo. True color holograms are one of the best ways to prevent counterfeiters from duplicating.

== See also ==
- Security printing
