= Addie MS =

Indonesian music conductor

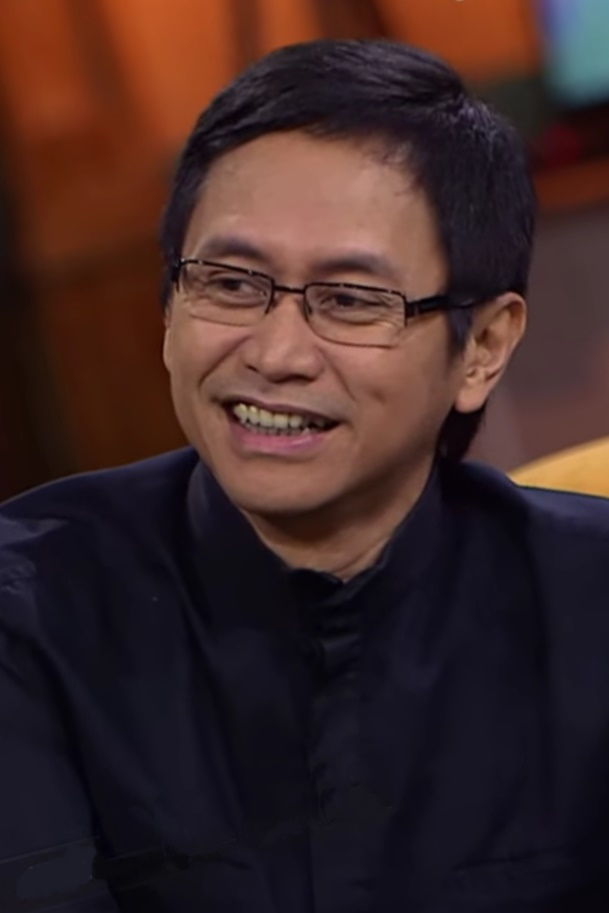
- Addie in 2017
- Born: Addie Muljadi Sumaatmadja; 7 October 1959 (age 66); Jakarta, Indonesia
- Citizenship: Indonesian
- Occupations: Arranger; conductor; composer; producer
- Years active: 1977–present
- Spouse: Memes (m. 1987)
- Children: 2
- Musical career
- Genres: Orchestra; pop

Addie Muljadi Sumaatmadja (born 7 October 1959) is an Indonesian conductor, producer and composer of Sundanese and Javanese descent. He currently directs the Twilite Orchestra, which he founded in 1991.

Born in Jakarta to a tile factory owner, Addie became interested in music at an early age. By the age of 12 he was studying to play the piano, and during high school he became involved with several musical projects. After failing to finish his university studies, Addie focused entirely on music. His first forays were into pop music, but in 1991 he abandoned the genre for classical music by dedicating himself entirely to his new orchestra. Since then, he has continued to conduct Twilite Orchestra, although he occasionally ventures into film soundtracks and pop songs.

== Biography ==
=== Early life and pop music ===
Addie was born in Jakarta on 7 October 1959 to a tile factory owner and his wife, being the third of eight children. His family on his mother's side was musically inclined, with most of his female relatives were able to play the piano. As a child and teenager he was rebellious, to the point that he changed middle schools three times in as many years and often went truant. When he was 12, he received a secondhand piano which he learned to play.

Addie later attended SMA 3 in Setiabudi, South Jakarta where he assisted several musicians such as Keenan Nasution put on shows. He also participated in the production of the albums Karya Cipta Guruh Sukarnoputra and Lomba Cipta Lagu Remaja, Prambors. After high school, Addie worked as a clerk at his father's factory but quit after a month due to being "unable to balance the books". He attempted to pursue his higher education, first at Trisakti University then at Krisnadwipayana University. He however abandoned his studies in 1984 when he was asked by composer Titiek Hamzah to conduct the orchestra in a pop song competition in Viña del Mar, Chile to perform her song which won second place at the competition.

In 1982, Addie produced Vina Panduwinata's album, Citra Pesona (Charm Image). In 1984 he was approached by Chrisye, one of his idols, and asked to produce the singer's next album. Although Addie felt that he was unworthy compared to Chrisye's earlier collaborators Eros Djarot and Jockie Soerjoprajogo, he accepted. The resulting album, Sendiri, which featured piano, cor anglais went on to win a BASF Award for best selling album. That same year he went to Ohio to take a course on recording engineering.

=== Twilite Orchestra and other projects ===
Addie founded the Jakarta-based Twilite Orchestra in 1991. To focus on the orchestra, he quit his earlier job of producing pop music recordings and jingles. He now serves as both conductor and manager. In 1994 he orchestrated three works on Suzanne Ciani's Grammy-nominated album Dream Suite, and the following year he attended a workshop on conducting in Los Angeles.

In 2003, Addie composed the Indonesian National Armed Forces March and Hymn. That same year he composed the score to Biola Tak Berdawai, a film directed by his friend Sekar Ayu Asmara. In August of the following year, Addie founded the Twilite Youth Orchestra to spread awareness of classic music amongst Indonesia's youth. The youth orchestra stemmed from an outreach program Twilite had started in 1998. Since 2006 he has also been active with the St. Theresia School Orchestra, which is composed mainly of students of the school. In 2005, he arranged songs for pop singers such as Agnes Monica and Rita Effendi. The following year he prepared the soundtrack for Cinta Pertama, with vocals by the film's star Bunga Citra Lestari.

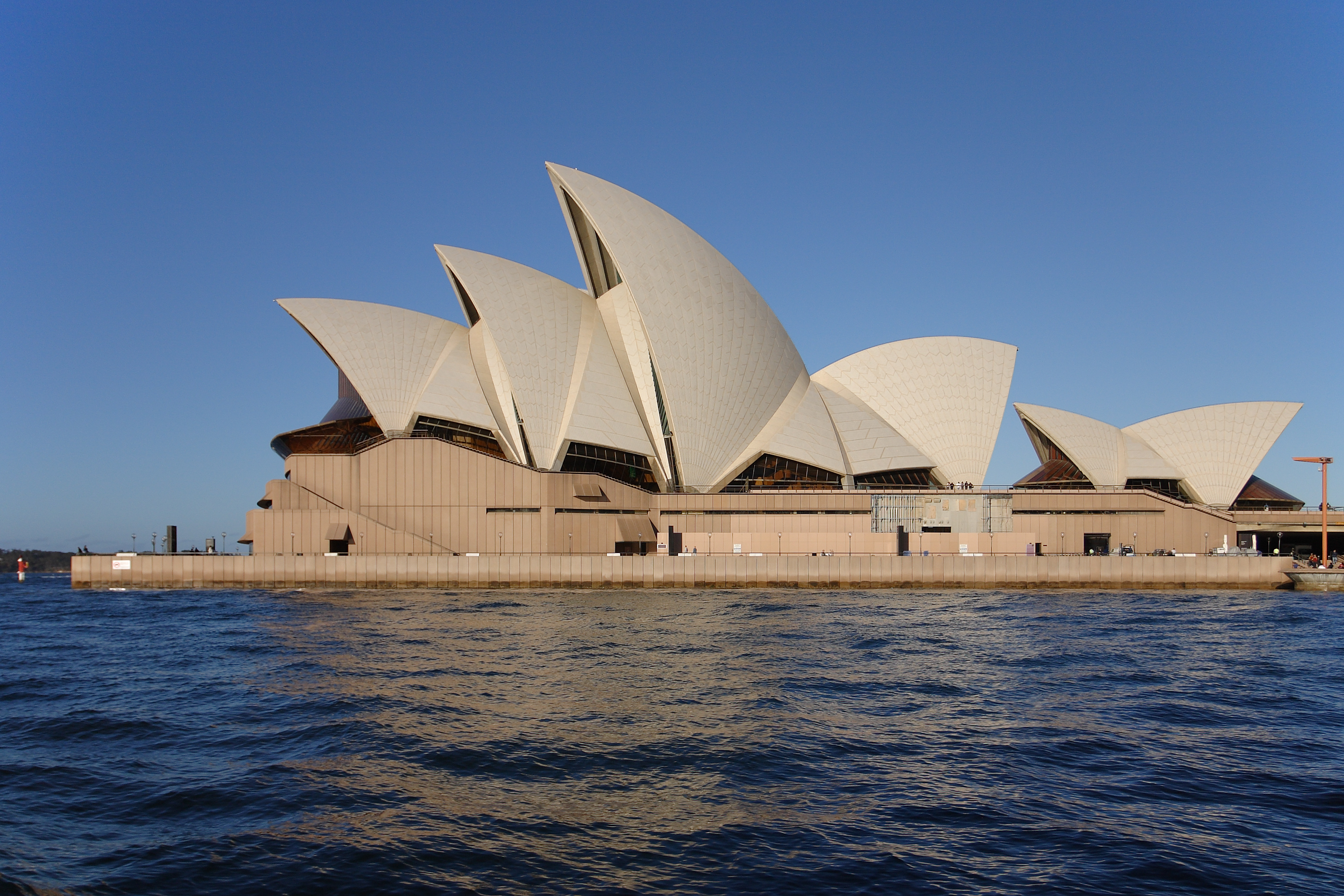
In 2009, Addie and the Twilite Orchestra became the first Indonesia orchestra to play at the Sydney Opera House.

Addie brought the Twilite Orchestra to Sydney, Australia in 2009 with the assistance of the Indonesian Tourism Ministry; which became the first Indonesian orchestra to play at the Sydney Opera House. The concert; which included covers of "Indonesia Pusaka" ("Indonesia, the Heritage") by Ismail Marzuki, "Bengawan Solo" by Gesang Martohartono, and "Tabuh-Tabuhan" by Canadian composer Colin McPhee; served to promote tourism to Indonesia.

In 2011, Addie collaborated with music director Andi Rianto to release the book Simfoni Untuk Negeri (Symphony for the Country). That same year, he led Twilite Orchestra in adapting the manga Nodame Cantabile into a concert. The performance, entitled Cantabile 2, made its debut at Aula Simfonia Concert Hall in Kemayoran, Jakarta, on 16 July and featured works by Pyotr Ilyich Tchaikovsky, Ludwig van Beethoven, and Mikhail Glinka.

Addie with the Light Ministry Orchestra successfully held the LMO's inaugural concert A Night of Light in 2023. Two years later, Addie with LMO, Septem Stellarum Youth Choir of Saint Ursula BSD, Penabur Children Choir and Percik Children and Youth Choir to perform at Rise Through Rhythm, which became LMO's first concert to feature youth choirs.

== Personal life ==
In a 2011 interview with Indah Setiawati of The Jakarta Post, Addie described himself as a workaholic. Although he enjoys reading and watching orchestral performances, he reportedly has little time for them.

As of 2011, Addie lives in Pondok Labu, Cilandak, South Jakarta. He is married to pop singer Memes; together they have two sons, both of which have been taught to play music since their early childhood.
