= St. Ursula Catholic School =

School in Jakarta, Indonesia

Coordinates: 6.168618°S 106.834143°E

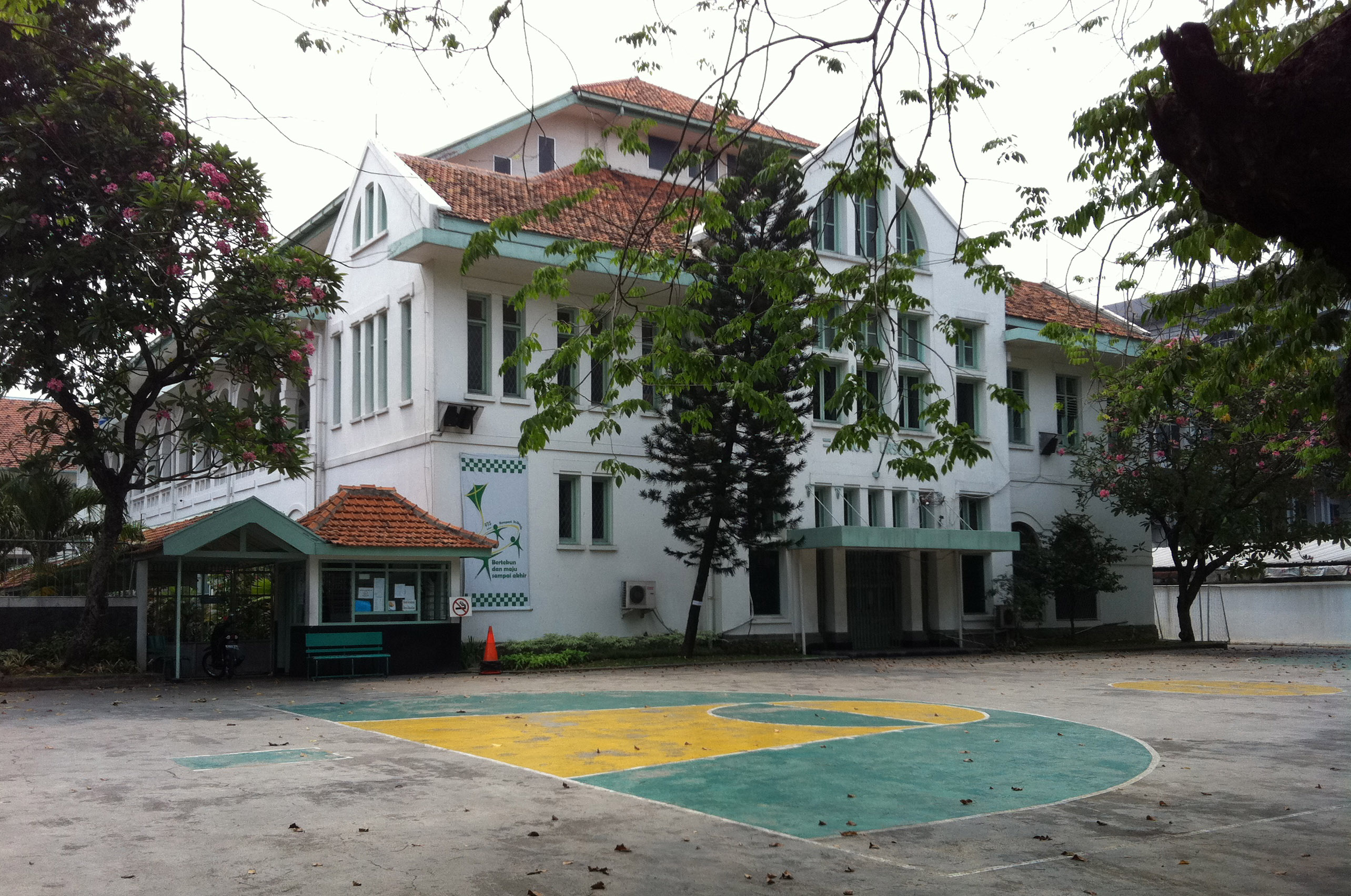
SMA Santa Ursula in Jakarta

Santa Ursula Catholic School or Sekolah Katolik Santa Ursula is an all-female Catholic school located in Jakarta, Indonesia. It is located next to Jakarta Cathedral and Filateli Post Office. The school has a branch in BSD, Tangerang. After its initial establishment as an Ursuline Convent in 1859, the Ursulines established the Prinses Juliana School in Batavia in 1912. At present, the school is known as Santa Ursula Catholic School. The school has been attended by the daughter of Indonesia's founding father, Sukarno, the daughters of Indonesia's first vice president, Mohammad Hatta, along with other notable public figures in Indonesia.

== History ==
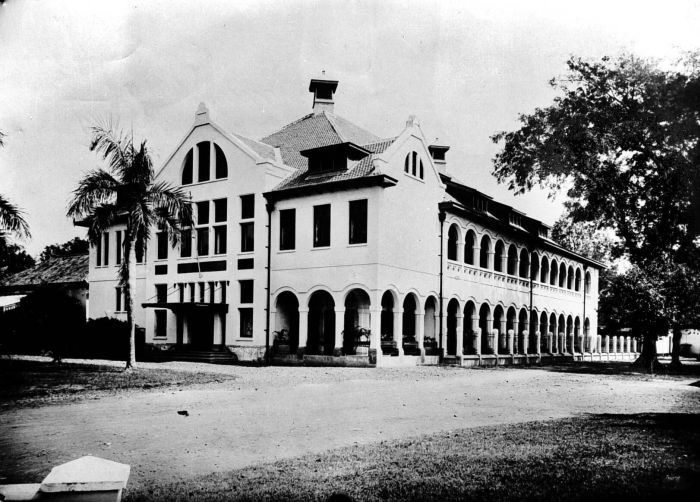
The school in early 20th-century, back then known as Prinses Juliana school.

The Order of St. Ursula from Rotterdam was the first of the many groups of sisters who entered the Dutch Indies. In 1858 they founded a convent by the name of Ursulinen Klooster, with their first convent in Nordwijk (Jalan Juanda) named St. Mary Convent. A year later the first convent located in Noordwijk became overcrowded and some activities were moved to a bigger house in Postweg (Jalan Pos). A new building was eventually developed and became known as Kleine Klooster ("small cloister"), to distinguish it from the older Saint Mary's convent, known as Groote klooster ("big cloister").

A Neogothic chapel was later added in 1888 and finally the Prinses Juliana School in 1912. After the independence of Indonesia, the school became known as St. Ursula Catholic School.

== Facilities ==
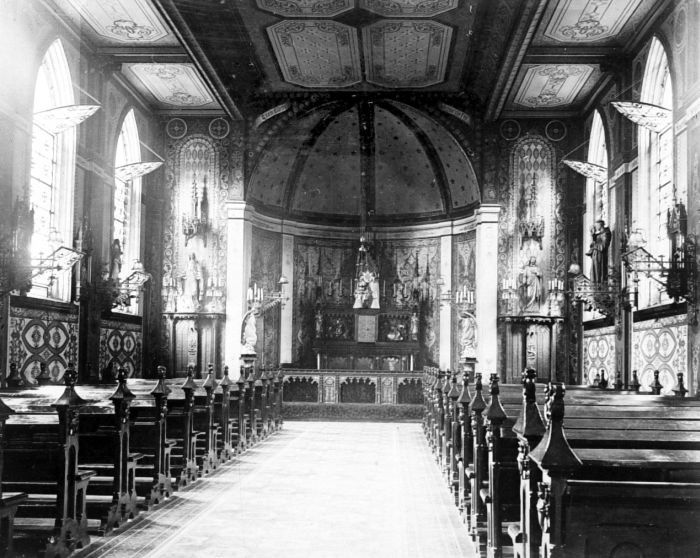
Monastery chapel

The school consists of a kindergarten, elementary school, junior high school, and high school. The kindergarten and elementary school are co-educational. St. Ursula junior high school and high school in Jakarta only admits female students, while St. Ursula BSD are co-educational.

== Co-curricular activities ==
Co-curricular activities in St. Ursula High School are divided into intra-curricular and extracurricular activities.

=== Intra-curricular ===
The intra-curricular activities are mandatory. There are two categories: foreign languages and humanities, and students are required to take one from each category.

==== Foreign languages ====
- Dutch
- English
- French
- German
- Japanese
- Korean
- Mandarin

Santa Ursula is one of 29 PASCH (German acronym for the initiative "Schools: Partners for the Future") schools in Indonesia. This initiative is coordinated by Germany's Federal Foreign Office, which puts it into action together with the Central Agency for German Schools Abroad, the German Academic Exchange Service, the Goethe-Institut and the Pädagogischer Austauschdienst (PAD). The school offers intensive and regular German-language instruction not only as a school subject in itself, but also across other fields of learning such as natural science and social studies.

==== Humanities ====
- Vocal Group
- Javanese Gamelan
- Graphic Design
- Angklung
- Fashion Design
- Photography
- Beauty
- Handicraft
- Balinese Gamelan
- Kolintang
- Orchestra
- Painting
- Cooking
- Pergamano
- Cinematography
- Modern/Traditional Dance
- Tatting

=== Extracurricular ===
Extracurricular activities are optional, but students are allowed to take any as they wish as long as they're willing to commit for at least one academic year.

==== Available activities ====
- Archery
- Badminton
- Basketball
- Cheerleaders
- Choir
- Cross Culture
- English Debate
- Futsal
- Intensive German
- Match Club
- Marching Brass
- Band
- Modern Dance
- Programming
- Self-defense
- TOEFL
- Volleyball
- Youth Science Group

== Notable alumnae ==
- Merry Riana
- Stella Christie
- Nurmala Kartini Sjahrir
- Meutia Hatta
- Rachmawati Soekarnoputri
- Ira Koesno
- Astrid Susanto

== See also ==
- St. Ursula School Bumi Serpong Damai
- List of colonial buildings and structures in Jakarta
