= Beibehaltungsgenehmigung =

Type of government-issued certificate

A Beibehaltungsgenehmigung (Permission to Retain Citizenship) was a certificate issued by the German Federal Government in accordance with Section 25(2) of the Nationality Law, now repealed.

A Beibehaltungsgenehmigung (or BBG) allowed a German citizen to acquire the citizenship of a specific foreign country without losing their German citizenship. As of 28 August 2007, a Beibehaltungsgenehmigung had already no longer been required when acquiring the citizenship of a European Union Member State or Switzerland.

Since June 27, 2024, there are no restrictions on possession of multiple citizenships or nationalities as far as Germany is concerned, although other countries may still impose such restrictions.

== Background ==
German law was historically restrictive with regard to multiple citizenship. It was permitted only:

1. If the other citizenship is that of another EU country or Switzerland.
2. If a German citizen acquires a non-EU or non-Swiss citizenship with the permission of the German Government (e.g., typically granted with existing family ties or property in Germany or in the other country or if the occupation abroad requires domestic citizenship for execution). The voluntary acquisition of a non-EU or non-Swiss citizenship without permission usually means the automatic loss of the German citizenship (but see Point 3).
3. If a non-German citizen acquires German citizenship by naturalization, and renunciation of the other citizenship(s) would be "very difficult." Such difficulty is to be assumed if any of six conditions apply, including unreasonable difficulties in renouncing, holding a refugee travel document, and the potential economic hardship of renunciation exceeding a cost of 10,225.84 euros (originally 20,000 Deutsche Marks).
4. If a person, or their qualified descendants, receives restored citizenship under Article 116 par. 2 of the Basic Law (Grundgesetz), which states that former German citizens who between 30 January 1933, and 8 May 1945 were deprived of their German citizenship on political, racial, or religious grounds may re-invoke their citizenship (as if it had never been lost), and may hold dual (or multiple) citizenship. Such restored citizens need not have ever lived in Germany.
5. If a child born to a German parent acquires German citizenship and one or more other citizenships at birth, e.g., based on place of birth (birth in jus soli countries, mostly in the Americas) or descent from one parent (one German parent and one foreign parent). (Of course, the nationality and citizenship laws of the other countries of the child's citizenship(s) may or may not allow for multiple citizenships, and have their own declaration, selection, or retention requirements.)
6. Children born on or after 1 January 2000 to non-German parents acquire German citizenship at birth if at least one parent has a permanent residence permit (and has had this status for at least three years) and was residing in Germany for at least eight years prior to the child's birth. The child must have lived in Germany for at least eight years or attended school for six years before their 21st birthday. Non-EU- and non-Swiss-citizen parents born and grown up abroad cannot usually have dual citizenship themselves (but see Point 1).

61% of people who naturalised as German citizens in 2017 who applied for permission to retain their original citizenship(s) under the hardship exception, were successful in obtaining approval to do so, including more than 81% of new German citizens from the Americas. However, it was only 17% for Turkish applicants in 2015.

German citizens who acquire the citizenship of any country outside the EU or Switzerland had to first obtain a Beibehaltungsgenehmigung; otherwise, they would lose their German citizenship upon acquiring the foreign citizenship.

== Procedure ==
A Beibehaltungsgenehmigung was not granted automatically to everyone who applied, but only on a discretionary basis depending on the applicant's circumstances. The individual's personal, family and professional situation and public reputation was considered when deciding whether to grant the Beibehaltungsgenehmigung. A Beibehaltungsgenehmigung may be issued if the acquisition of the foreign citizenship along with the retention of German citizenship is justified by the applicant's personal and public situation and there were no compelling reasons why the application should be refused. The former German legal principle of avoidance of multiple citizenship had to be taken into consideration during the authorities’ decision-making process.

=== Grounds ===
The eligibility requirements for a Beibehaltungsgenehmigung were set out in law:

- It must be of compelling personal interest to the applicant to acquire the foreign citizenship. In particular, a "compelling interest" is deemed to exist if acquiring the foreign citizenship would prevent or eradicate considerable and sufficiently specific economic disadvantages, such as being unable to access a pension.
- The applicant would be considerably disadvantaged if they lost their German citizenship. Such disadvantages must go beyond merely administrative limitations, such as requiring a visa or losing the freedom of movement bestowed by a German passport.
- The foreign country must allow dual citizenship.

For applicants whose habitual place of residence was not in Germany, the granting of a Beibehaltungsgenehmigung depended primarily on whether the applicant's ties to Germany remained strong enough to justify holding dual citizenship. On the other hand, any compelling personal interests were less important to the decision.

=== Authority ===
German citizens whose registered place of residence was in Germany had to apply to their local citizenship authority.

German citizens whose habitual place of residence was not in Germany had apply to their local German embassy or consulate, which will forwarded the application to the Federal Office of Administration in Cologne.

==== In practice ====
Over 131,000 people naturalised as German citizens in 2022, with 74.2 per cent of them retaining their previous nationalities after being granted a Beibehaltungsgenehmigung. The amount of given exceptions varies widely from one non-EFTA country to another. For Brits it is 97.2%, whereas for Turks it is 7.5%, for Indians 4.3%.
