= NDSA =

NDSA may refer to:

- National Digital Stewardship Alliance, United States
- New German School of Alexandria (Neue Deutsche Schule Alexandria)
- National Defense Space Architecture
