= March of the Indonesian National Armed Forces =

Military march

Mars Tentara Nasional Indonesia
English: March of the Indonesian National Armed Forces
- Lyrics: Addie MS, 2003
- Music: Addie MS, 2003
- Adopted: 5 October 2003

Audio sample
- Mars Tentara Nasional Indonesia: file; help

March of the Indonesian National Armed Forces is the official march of the Indonesian National Armed Forces. The lyrics and music were composed by Addie MS. In conjunction with the March, Addie MS also composed the Hymn of the Indonesian National Armed Forces as the official hymn of the Indonesian National Armed Forces.

== Background ==
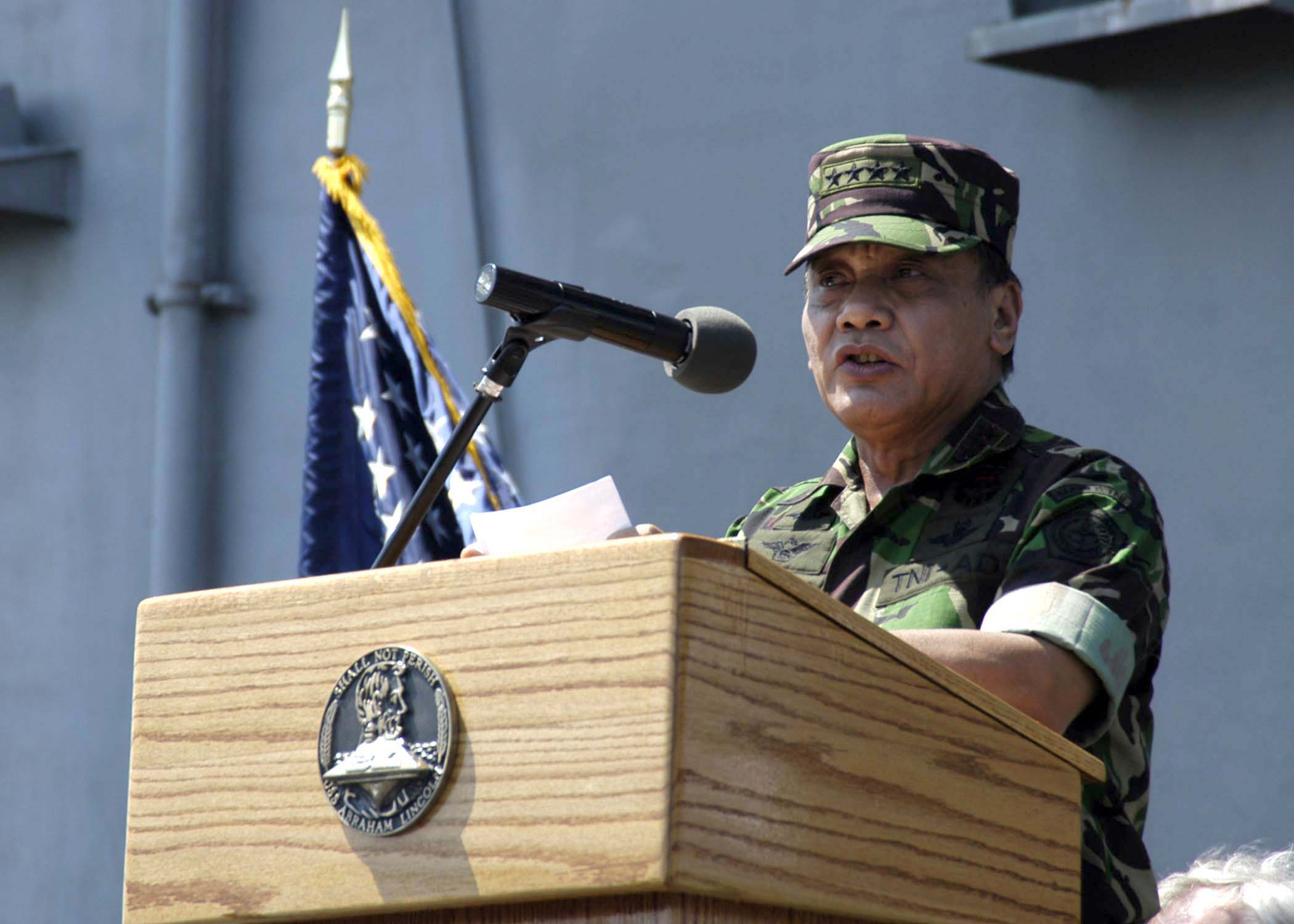
Endriartono Sutarto proposed the creation of a new march for the armed forces.

Before the creation of the current march, the Republic of Indonesia Armed Forces — the predecessor of the current armed forces — had its own march. The March of the Republic of Indonesia Armed Forces was composed in 1962 by Mangasa Adil Tampubolon (1939-1992), a lieutenant colonel in the Indonesian Army. However, following the fall of Suharto in 1998, the song was rarely used by the armed forces due to frequent mocking and parodying of the song by activists and students. For example, a popular parody of the song changed the first stanza of the song from "Republic of Indonesia Armed Forces/Always ready at any time/To defend and save/The Republic of Indonesia" (Note: Original translation: Angkatan Bersenjata Republik Indonesia/Setiap saat, siap sedia/Mempertahankan, menyelamatkan/Negara Republik Indonesia) to "Republic of Indonesia Armed Forces/Useless, dissolve it/Replace with the student regiment, still the same/Let's replace it with scouts instead". (Note: Original translation: Angkatan Bersenjata Republik Indonesia/Tidak berguna, bubarkan saja/Diganti menwa, ya, sama saja/Lebih baik diganti pramuka) Ninok Leksono, a Kompas reporter, alleged that the parody discouraged the armed forces from using the march and began a discourse to find a replacement.

However, the commander of the Armed Forces at that time, Endriartono Sutarto, denied that the discourse was prompted by the parody. In an interview with Tempo, Endriartono stated that the discourse was not related to the parody at all; instead, it was prompted by the reorganization of the armed forces. The discourse led to the 2002 decision by Endriartono to commission a new march for the armed forces.

== Contest and composing process ==
Initially, Endriartono held a contest for the musical units inside the armed forces. Units from the army, navy, and the air force submitted their proposals, but none of the proposals were approved by the generals. The Head of the Information Bureau of the Armed Forces, Major General Sjafrie Sjamsoeddin, proposed Addie MS to compose the march. Other generals approved the proposal, and in December 2002, Endriartono sent a letter to Addie MS requesting him to compose the march. Addie MS stated in a 2003 interview that he was shocked after receiving the letter, and that this would be his first time composing a march.

The letter, which was signed by the Personnel Assistant to the Chief of General Staff Major-General Sutardjo, stated that "In accordance with the organizational change and the separation of the Indonesian National Police from the armed forces, we asked you to compose a new march and hymn for the armed forces or revise the proposals submitted during the contest to replace the March of the Republic of Indonesia Armed Forces." (Note: Original translation: sehubungan dengan adanya perubahan organisasi dan pemisahan Kepolisian Negara RI dari TNI, Addie MS diminta membantu menciptakan lagu mars dan himne TNI yang baru, atau merevisi lagu/syair mars dan himne hasil lomba untuk menggantikan Mars ABRI) In the letter, the armed forces also wrote down several criteria regarding the lyrics and tempo. The march must include references to the three main doctrines of the armed forces: Saptamarga, the Soldier's Oath, and Pancasila. The song was required to have a minimum of 32 bars, a time signature of either 2/4, 4/4, or 6/8, and a tempo of 120 beats per minute. The Chief of Staff of the Air Force at that time, Chappy Hakim, also asked Addie to include the phrase Satria Nusantara (Warrior of the Archipelago), which was also the name of a popular martial art in Indonesia at that time.

After the composition was complete, Addie MS requested and received permission to record his song in Melbourne, Australia. In August 2003 he flew to the city, where he conducted the instrumental recording in a studio owned by the Victorian Philharmonic Orchestra. The instrumental recording was played by fifty musicians from the Victorian Philharmonic Orchestra. The vocal recording was done in Jakarta by 20 singers, including some members of Addie's Twilite Choir. Overall, Addie spent a total of US$3,800 for the instrumental recording process and 5 million rupiahs for the vocal recording process.

The finished recording was first presented to the commander of the music corps. After approving the recording, the commander circulated the lyrics and recording among various flag officers in the armed forces hierarchy. The final presentation was done on 28 August 2003 in front of Commander Endriartono, the three chiefs of staff of the armed forces, chief of staff of the armed forces, head of the information bureau, and the personnel assistant to the chief of staff. After they listened to the recording, they commented that the phrase Satria Nusantara could be mistaken for a reference to the martial art, and requested the phrase to be removed or changed. Addie later changed the phrase to Patriot Nusantara (Patriot of the Archipelago). In a 2020 article written by Chappy, Chappy apologized for proposing the Satria Nusantara phrase.

== Performance ==
The song received its public premiere at the 58th anniversary of the armed forces on 5 October 2003. It was regularly performed by the armed forces, but there had been no official ceremony marking the adoption of the march. A ceremony honoring the composer was held fifteen years later on 5 October 2018, where the Commander in Chief of the Armed Forces Hadi Tjahjanto gave Addie a placard and a shell in recognition of his work as the composer of the march.

== Lyrics ==
Bahasa Indonesia

Tentara Nasional Indonesia
Siap mempertahankan negara
Dengan Sumpah Prajurit
dan Sapta Marga
Kobarkan semangat Pancasila

Tentara Nasional Indonesia
Siap membela Nusa dan Bangsa
Membangun persatuan
dan kesatuan
Di darat, di laut, di udara

Prajurit TNI
Patriot Nusantara
Bersama Rakyat
Bangun Negeri tercinta
Negara Republik Indonesia

English Translation (unofficial)

Indonesian National Armed Forces
Ready to defend the state
With Soldier's Oath
and Sapta Marga
Fired up the spirit of Pancasila

Indonesian National Armed Forces
Ready to defend the Homeland and Nation
Building unity
and unitary
On land, at sea, in the air

Soldiers of the TNI
Patriots of Nusantara
Together with the People
Build our beloved country
The State of the Republic of Indonesia

In addition to the March, Addie MS also composed the TNI Hymn (Hymne TNI).

Bahasa Indonesia

Bersatu prajurit TNI
Satria Merah Putih
Luhur mengabdikan diri
Bela Ibu Pertiwi

Teguh pada Sumpah Setia
Takwa kepada Tuhan
Rela korbankan
Jiwa Raga
Demi Indonesia

English Translation (unofficial)

United soldiers of TNI
Knights of the Red and White
Noble devoting yourself
to defend the Motherland

Firm to Oath of Loyalty
Piety to God
Willing to sacrifice
Body and Soul
For the sake of Indonesia
