= German nationality law =

Nationality Act Staatsangehörigkeitsgesetz
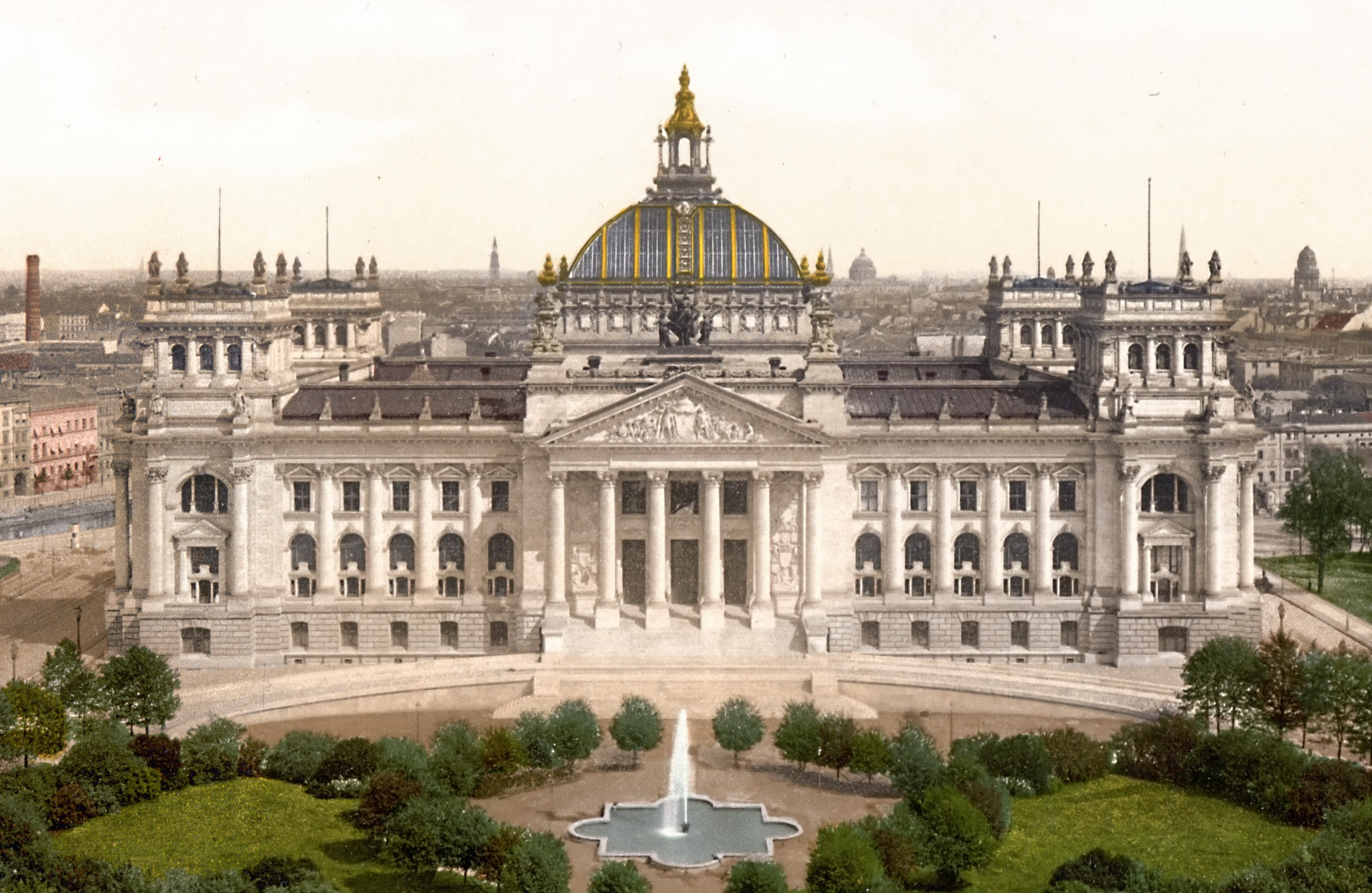

Reichstag
- Citation: RGBl at 583, revised as BGBl III at 102-1
- Territorial extent: Germany
- Enacted by: 13th Reichstag
- Enacted: 22 July 1913
- Commenced: 1 January 1914
- Administered by: Federal Office of Administration

Related legislation
- Reich Citizenship Law; Federal Expellee Law
- Status: Amended

German nationality law details the conditions by which an individual is a national of Germany. The primary law governing these requirements is the Nationality Act, which came into force on 1 January 1914. Germany is a member state of the European Union (EU) and all German nationals are EU citizens. They have automatic and permanent permission to live and work in any EU or European Free Trade Association (EFTA) country and may vote in elections to the European Parliament.

Any person born to a married German parent is typically a German national at birth, regardless of the place of birth. Children of unmarried couples in which only the father is German must be legitimised for them to acquire German nationality. Individuals born in Germany to two foreign parents may also receive German nationality at birth if at least one of their parents has lived in the country for five years and is entitled to live in the country indefinitely (meaning any person with a settlement permit, or citizenship of another EU country or Switzerland). Foreign nationals may naturalise after residing in Germany for at least five years and demonstrating knowledge in the German language.

Germany is composed of territory historically part of the Holy Roman Empire and German Confederation that was separated into numerous small German states whose residents held citizenship of their locality. Over the course of the 19th century, the various German states moved towards integration into a single entity that culminated with the unification of Germany in 1871. German citizenship was generally held by virtue of being a citizen of a German state, and state citizenship remained a principally important concept in German law until the country's transition to Nazi rule.

Between 1933 and 1945, any person considered "undesirable" by the state (particularly Jews and political dissidents) was stripped of their civil and political rights and targeted for denaturalisation. Any person deprived of their German citizenship during this time based on political, racial, or religious grounds, as well as their direct descendants, are eligible to reclaim German citizenship at any time. Following the end of the Second World War, Germany was split into West Germany and East Germany. While West Germany continued to enforce existing pre-war nationality legislation and claimed all East Germans as its citizens, East Germany adopted a separate nationality law in 1967 which remained in force until German reunification in 1990.

== Terminology ==
The distinction between the meaning of the terms citizenship and nationality is not always clear in the English language and differs by country. Generally, nationality refers a person's legal belonging to a country and is the common term used in international treaties when referring to members of a state; citizenship refers to the set of rights and duties a person has in that nation. It can be possible for a non-national to obtain a degree of civil and political rights commonly associated with citizenship (e.g. residence or working rights) while it is also possible for a national to be prohibited from exercising certain rights (e.g. children barred from voting). In German, the term "nationality" (Staatsangehörigkeit) refers to state membership while "citizenship" (Staatsbürgerschaft/Bürgerschaft) describes a person's participation in national society.

== Decentralised development ==
The Holy Roman Empire in 1789

The German Confederation in 1815

The German Empire in 1914

Germany lacked a strong central authority for much of its history. Consequently, regulations on nationality and citizenship developed at an uneven pace among the numerous Holy Roman vassal realms and German states with inconsistent rules.

Until the early 19th century, German lands constituted the core part of the highly decentralised Holy Roman Empire. Each of the roughly 1,800 individual political entities within the Empire had varying (or non-existent) definitions on who they considered to be members of their polity. "Citizenship" in this context was tied to a person's settlement in a particular municipality and individuals found outside of their ordinary places of residence could be deported to other parts of imperial territory.

The modern concept of citizenship, as a formal and legal relationship between an individual and a state that confers privileges to holders and a status that persists beyond continued territorial residence, emerged during the French Revolution. Following the dissolution of the Holy Roman Empire in 1806, this model of citizenship was imported into the German territories that became part of the French-led Confederation of the Rhine, though any applicable legislation from this period was repealed in the 1810s shortly after French defeat in the Napoleonic Wars. Outside of this Confederation, Austria enacted its first codified regulations based on the modern citizenship concept in 1811.

As a result of the Congress of Vienna, the German Confederation was created in 1815 as a permanent replacement for the Holy Roman Empire and included virtually all of the former Empire's territory. This political structure was not a federal state and sovereign power remained with the 38 individual member states. Each state continued to hold jurisdiction over citizenship, but the vast majority of them passed no specific codified laws on the subject until the mid-19th century. Prussia enacted its first citizenship law in 1842. Other than through naturalisation, Prussian citizenship was only passed by descent from a Prussian father (or mother, if the parents were unmarried).

=== Confederal policy alignment ===
Any applicable contemporary legislation in the Confederation was inconsistent among the states and generally ineffectual at determining the citizenship of a particular person. State regulations often assumed the existence of some type of citizenship that a child would inherit from their father at the time of their birth. However, any person born in the 18th century who would have been a citizen of an area of the Holy Roman Empire that no longer existed as a political entity would have had an undefined status in state law.

Conversely, every state had concluded by the 1820s at least one treaty with some or all other members of the Confederation that detailed the deportation of undesirable persons without state citizenship and process of "implicit naturalisation". A German who resided in another state for at least 10 years was considered to have been naturalised implicitly in their new place of domicile. An implicitly naturalised father would have automatically passed his changed citizenship status to his entire family. In seven states, this process was extended to any alien who fulfilled the minimum residence requirement. These interstate treaties additionally clarified the position of persons with unclear status, who were granted the contemporary existing citizenship of their birthplace (if that was uncertain, then the place where they were found). Germans lost their state citizenship if they left state territory with the intent to reside elsewhere permanently, had obtained formal permission to emigrate, or otherwise continuously lived outside of their home state for at least 10 years.

Theoretically, the Constitution of the German Confederation created a common German nationality. Article 18 of the document detailed a set of basic rights for every German; any subject of a German state was entitled to freely purchase property in any part of the Confederation, emigrate to other states willing to admit them, enlist in another state's armed forces or civil service, and were exempt from a tax on emigration. In practice, the member states did not permit Germans from other states to freely immigrate into their territories, rendering these constitutional rights generally moot. The Frankfurt Parliament expanded on this idea of a unified German nationality; any state citizen of the short-lived 1848–1849 German Empire was also a German national, and all German nationals held the same rights as citizens of any German state.

Multilateral negotiations among the states resumed after the German Confederation was reconstituted in 1849. Prussia and 20 other states agreed on the Gotha Treaty in 1851, which lowered the residence requirement for implicit naturalisation to five years and introduced a formal distinction between emigration to other German states and emigration to jurisdictions outside of the Confederation. All German states had acceded to this treaty by 1861.

=== Unification and imperial law ===
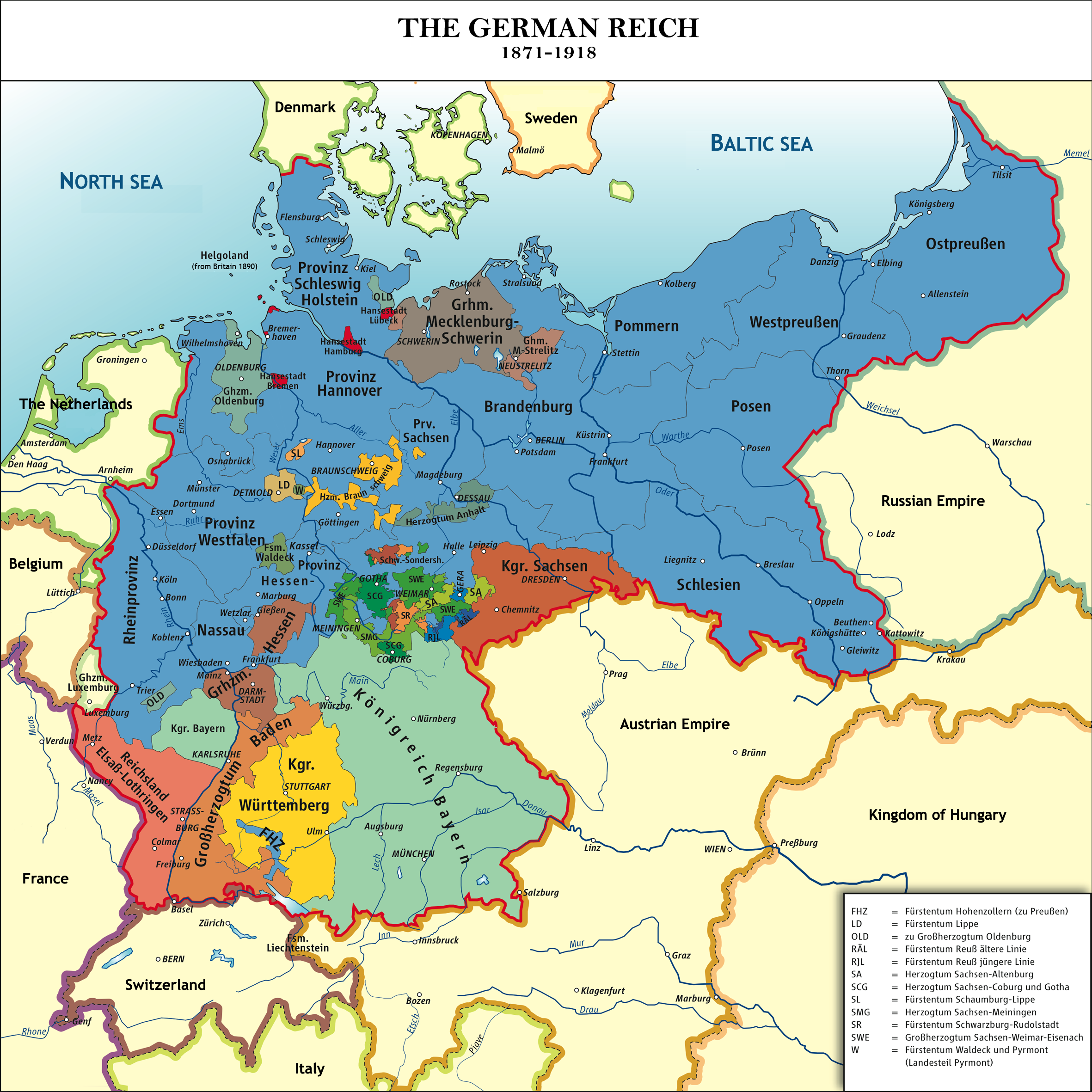
Even after unification in 1871, each German state maintained a separate citizenship. A citizen of any state was also a citizen of the German Empire.

The Confederation was dissolved in 1866 as a consequence of the Austro-Prussian War. Prussia formed a new union, the North German Confederation, consisting of all the German states north of the Main. Four southern states (Baden, Bavaria, Hesse, and Württemberg) remained independent until their accession to the union during the 1870 Franco-Prussian War. Prussia's 1842 citizenship law served as the basis for federal nationality regulations, which were adopted that same year. The United States negotiated during this time a set of individual Bancroft Treaties with the North German Confederation and the four southern states for mutual recognition of each other's naturalised citizens.

Following the North German victory against France, the Confederation was reformed into the German Empire in 1871. International bilateral agreements with the southern German states became superseded by imperial law. In the annexed region of Alsace–Lorraine, residents were allowed a choice between German and French nationalities. Individuals electing to remain French were required to permanently depart for France by 1 October 1872, although those who did not leave by then were allowed to remain, with German citizenship. Former Confederation members Liechtenstein (closely aligned with Austria) and Luxembourg (permanently neutral under the 1867 Treaty of London and in personal union with the Netherlands) continued as independent states outside of the German Empire.

State citizenship remained principally important in almost all of Germany; imperial citizenship was held by virtue of holding state citizenship, which continued to be acquired in separate processes per state, and German passports listed a holder's nationality as Prussian, Bavarian, Saxon, or whichever label was applicable. However, because Alsatian-Lorrainers and white residents of German colonies were not domiciled in a federal state, they were simply "German".

The concept of a German nationality based on ethnicity and descent became a core principle in the 1913 Imperial and State Citizenship Act (Reichs- und Staatsangehörigkeitsgesetz). While prior regulations had maintained preexisting models of state membership through residency, this law made descent from German heritage the primary qualification for nationality. Before the law's enactment on January 1, 1914, Germans who lived abroad for more than 10 years were automatically deprived of their nationality but after this reform, any former national who remained living overseas (as well as any of their descendants) were able to apply for German nationality with no requirement to reestablish residence in Germany. Individuals who became nationals in this way were granted "direct imperial citizenship" rather than citizenship of any particular state. Germans could still be automatically denaturalised after extended residence overseas or obtaining another nationality, but this could be avoided by registering their intent to continue holding German citizenship at a German consulate.

Foreigners resident in Germany who held no criminal record, maintained their own housing, and provided for themselves and their families could apply for naturalisation. However, fulfilling the technical requirements did not give applicants the right to become German nationals. Final approval for a grant of nationality was given at the sole discretion of the imperial government, which was extremely restrictive in practice. Only applicants who had served for at least one year in the German military or those who were employed by the German government and had met the other naturalisation requirements were entitled to become German nationals by right.

Colonial subjects (Schutzgebietsangehörige) held an unclearly defined legal status and were never granted German nationality at large. Any children of mixed-race heritage had to be officially approved for "European" status, subject to detailed examination of an applicant's heritage, education, professional background, and social standing. Any other native resident of a German colony, or foreigners domiciled there, would have been required to naturalise to acquire German nationality.

== Interwar and Nazi regulations ==
The Weimar Republic in 1930

Nazi Germany in 1938 after annexing Austria

Germany before the Second World War in 1939

Germany's rapid incorporation of neighbouring territories in the 1930s added a large number of new German citizens.

After its defeat in the First World War, Germany lost control of several territories. France regained Alsace–Lorraine and all residents who had been French before 1870, as well as their descendants, automatically reacquired French nationality. However, any person descended from a German father or grandfather who was not previously French did not qualify for automatic reacquisition and were required to naturalise. Any person domiciled in Northern Schleswig on 15 June 1920 obtained Danish nationality, but could opt for reversion to German nationality provided that they elected to do so before 1923 and resettled in Germany within 12 months of their decision. Similarly, Germans who remained living in newly independent Poland and the Free City of Danzig became Polish and Danziger nationals.

=== Systemic exclusion of Jews and undesirables ===
The 1919 Weimar Constitution reiterated the same basic principles for nationality as in the 1913 law while additionally providing citizens with basic entitlements for protection by the government within and without Germany, and shielding them from extradition to foreign countries. As the country transitioned into a unitary state under Nazi rule in 1933, state citizenship was abolished as a separate concept and became subsumed into German citizenship as a whole. The new regime enacted the 1933 Denaturalisation Act which enabled the selective revocation of nationality from any person considered "undesirable" who had naturalised between 1918 and 1933. Although the Interior Ministry announced that this measure would first be implemented with the approximately 150,000 Jews from eastern Europe who were living in Germany at that time, the vast majority of these Jews had encountered great difficulty in naturalising under the Weimar government, meaning that they were not actually affected by this change because they remained foreign citizens. This change instead affected political dissidents who fled Germany after Hitler's rise to power, who subsequently had their nationality revoked.

In the subsequent years, Jews were progressively excluded from participation in German society with ever more restrictive regulations prohibiting their activity in core sectors of the economy. This culminated with the enactment of the 1935 Reich Citizenship Act, which created a tiered citizenship hierarchy; members of the Aryan race became Reich citizens (Reichsbürger), who held an elevated status over existing state subjects (Staatsangehörige). Reich citizenship could be acquired by obtaining a certificate of citizenship. Although Reich citizenship technically held no special privileges and non-Aryans remained state citizens who were entitled to state protection in theory, this law provided the legal basis for further depriving civil and political rights from people who were deemed undesirable. Jews were specifically barred from holding Reich citizenship, and they (along with Romanis) formally lost their right to vote in German elections on 7 March 1936. Further regulations in 1940 automatically removed state citizenship from individuals who became domiciled abroad; Nazi concentration camps were included in the definition of "abroad". All remaining German Jews who were permanently domiciled overseas were denaturalised under the Eleventh Decree to the Reich Citizenship Act on 27 November 1941 and lost their status as state subjects. Between 150,000 and 180,000 people lost their German nationality through this decree.

=== Territories incorporated into the Reich ===
Austria was integrated into the German state following Anschluss on 13 March 1938. Austrians retained their existing citizenship until 3 July 1938, when all Austrians were granted Reich citizenship, regardless if they were resident in the country or not. Austrian nationality law was fully abrogated and replaced by German nationality law on 30 July 1939. Sudeten Germans living in the Sudetenland also automatically became Reich citizens when Germany annexed that territory following the Munich Agreement on 29 September 1938. Czech citizens in the Sudetenland were allowed to apply for Reich citizenship provided that they or their parents had resided in that area on or before 1 October 1910. However, this was subject to discretionary approval by German authorities and rejected applicants were required to depart permanently.

In the remaining Czech territory that was incorporated into Germany as the Protectorate of Bohemia and Moravia in 1939, Reich citizenship was only granted automatically to members of the Sudeten German Party. All other Czechoslovak citizens became Protectorate subjects, but ethnic Germans resident in the Protectorate could subsequently apply to become Reich citizens. Although Protectorate subjects did not hold citizenship and were excluded from employment in the government and armed forces, discriminatory policies based on Czech ancestry were never adopted to the same degree as they were for Jews. In fact, any Protectorate subject who had even distant German ancestry could apply for Reich citizenship, provided that they were willing to undergo a process of Germanisation and were not of Jewish descent.

Ethnic Germans in eastern areas directly annexed by Germany were granted Reich citizenship on 1 September 1939 if they were Danzig citizens or on 26 October 1939 if they were Polish citizens. Polish citizenship was completely abolished, and any person who did not otherwise become a Reich citizen was stateless. Poles who were selected to be forcibly Germanised were given Reich citizenship.

== Post-war policies ==
West Germany

East Germany

Reunited Germany

Germany was divided into two states during the Cold War. The American, British, and French occupation zones combined to become West Germany, while the Soviet-controlled region became East Germany. The East German states acceded to West Germany in 1990, ending the division of Germany.

Following its defeat in the Second World War, Germany was occupied by Allied forces. Austria was reestablished as a separate sovereign state on 27 April 1945 and any person of Austrian origin would have ceased to hold German citizenship from that date. Ethnic Germans in post-war Czechoslovakia were deprived of their Czechoslovak citizenship under the Beneš decrees, and more than 2.8 million affected people were deported to Germany. Similarly, 3.6 million Germans were expelled from Poland, including from former German territories east of the Oder–Neisse line. Germany itself was divided into two states in 1949, the Federal Republic of Germany (West Germany, FRG) and the German Democratic Republic (East Germany, GDR).

In the initial period following the division of Germany, both German governments maintained the idea of a common German nationality. East Germany gradually asserted a separate legal tradition and nationality over the following two decades that culminated with the adoption of its own nationality law in 1967 divergent from pre-war regulations. By contrast, the West German government regarded itself as the sole continuation of the German Reich and continued to regulate nationality under the 1913 Imperial and State Citizenship Act, assuming responsibility for all former citizens of the Reich according to its 1937 borders. In line with West German non-recognition of a separate East German status, all NATO member states treated East German passport holders as stateless persons until the 1960s.

The continued application of the 1913 law allowed the West German government to claim East Germans as its own nationals and to issue passports to any who managed to flee East Germany. Former East Germans who left the GDR without obtaining permission from the authorities were liable to imprisonment on their return to East Germany until the two governments normalised relations with the 1972 Basic Treaty. The GDR subsequently acknowledged any East German who had left the country between 7 October 1949 and 31 December 1971 as having lost East German nationality. Following a general trend of anti-communist movements in Eastern Europe beginning in 1989, the Peaceful Revolution began the process of German reunification. East Germany ceased to exist on 3 October 1990 and its constituent states became a part of the Federal Republic.

Ethnic Germans who were displaced as a result of the Second World War were eligible for special resettlement and nationality acquisition. The Federal Expellee Law defines a qualifying person as any ethnic German who was domiciled in the former eastern territories of Germany, or in any area outside of pre-1938 German borders and were deported or forced to flee. This right to citizenship extended to any descendants of an ethnic German, as well as their spouses. Over 1.4 million people from Eastern Bloc countries resettled in West Germany under these provisions between 1950 and 1987. Special admission for ethnic Germans was restricted in 1993 following democratisation of Eastern Europe; applicants became subject to a German language requirement and an entry quota of 225,000 people, which was later reduced to 100,000 in 2000. Eligibility for citizenship through ethnic German background has since been limited to individuals born before 1993, effectively ending future resettlement.

=== European integration ===
West German involvement in European integration began in the immediate post-war period of the late 1940s. Initial cooperation was focused on the economy through the Organisation for European Economic Co-operation as a condition for receiving aid from the United States provided by the Marshall Plan. The post-war political situation created the circumstances that facilitated the establishment of further organisations to integrate Western Europe along common social and security policies. West Germany became a founding member of the European Communities (EC) in 1951, a set of organisations that eventually developed into the European Union (EU). West German citizens participated in their first European Parliament elections in 1979 and have been able to work in other EC/EU countries under the freedom of movement for workers established by the 1957 Treaty of Rome. GDR accession to the Federal Republic in 1990 did not affect German membership in the EC. With the creation of European Union citizenship by the 1992 Maastricht Treaty, free movement rights were extended to all nationals of EU member states regardless of their employment status. The scope of these rights was further expanded with the establishment of the European Economic Area in 1994 to include any national of an EFTA member state except for Switzerland, which concluded a separate free movement agreement with the EU that came into force in 2002.

=== Expansion of access to citizenship ===
Debate over nationality law following German reunification focused on the integration of immigrants into the national community. Although the West German government had actively recruited foreign labour since 1955, immigrants were not considered part of German society and an official integration policy did not become a government priority until the 1990s. A growing number of migrant workers had children who were born in Germany, educated domestically, and later employed in the country but still held foreign nationality despite their long periods of residence and assimilation.

Naturalisation regulations were relaxed in 1991 to allow noncitizens between the ages of 16 and 23 to acquire citizenship if they had been legally domiciled in Germany for eight years, attended a school in the country for at least six years, had no criminal convictions, and renounced their previous nationalities. All other immigrants became eligible for naturalisation if they had lived in the country for 15 years, were self-subsistent, held no criminal record, and forfeited any other nationalities. These changes were implemented at the discretion of the government until they were codified in legislation in 1993.

More substantial changes were adopted in 1999, when birthright citizenship was introduced for children born since 1 January 2000 to noncitizen immigrants who had resided in Germany for at least eight years. Any such children who held another nationality at birth were required to choose between their German and foreign nationalities on reaching the age of 18. As a transitional arrangement, children born between 1990 and 1999 to applicable parents could also acquire citizenship by special registration, provided that their parents had registered them by the end of 2000. Until this change, German nationality had been transmitted to subsequent generations only by descent rather than by birth within Germany.

Requirements for naturalisation candidates were further relaxed in the 1999 reform as well; the residence requirement was reduced from 15 to eight years and immigrants from other EU countries or Switzerland no longer needed to renounce their previous citizenship before acquiring German nationality, provided that the relevant country reciprocated this treatment in its respective nationality law. This condition of reciprocity was removed in a subsequent 2007 amendment.

Conversely, denaturalisation rules applying to Germans who acquired another nationality were tightened. Although Germans who became citizens of another country also typically lost German nationality before 2000, those who had remained domiciled within Germany were exempted from this. Immigrants who renounced their previous nationality to become German nationals were able to subsequently reacquire that foreign nationality at a later date; this was particularly prevalent among the naturalised Turkish population, encouraged by the Turkish government. The denaturalisation exception was removed as part of the 1999 reform.

A 2024 nationality law reform, effective 26 June 2024, will decrease the residency requirement for naturalisation from eight to five years, allow birthright citizenship for children of those who have been German residents for five years and have the permission to reside in germany indefinitely (rather than eight years), and permit multiple nationality – removing all previous requirements to renounce previous citizenships upon German naturalisation and to renounce German citizenship after acquisition of a foreign citizenship.

== Acquisition and loss of nationality ==
=== Entitlement by birth or descent ===
Children born within Germany automatically receive German nationality at birth if at least one married parent is a German national. Individuals born overseas to at least one married German parent are also German nationals, unless that parent was born after 31 December 1999 and is ordinarily resident in a foreign country; they may alternatively acquire German nationality if they would otherwise be stateless or their births are registered at a German diplomatic mission before their first birthday. Children born to a German parent born after 31 December 1999 who acquired German nationality by descent must register the child with the German authorities prior to the child's first birthday for the child to also receive German nationality by descent.

Children born in the country to two foreign parents since 1 January 2000 automatically receive citizenship at birth if at least one parent has habitually resided in Germany for at least eight years and possesses indefinite permission to remain. This usually means holding a settlement permit. EU citizens are automatically granted right of permanent residence after living in the country for at least five years. Children born in Germany to such parents between 1990 and 1999 also qualified for citizenship, provided that their parents had registered them for that status by the end of 2000. Minor children who are adopted by German citizens within the country receive citizenship at the time of adoption, while those who are adopted outside of Germany (regardless of age) may acquire citizenship at governmental discretion.

Until 1953, German women who married foreign men automatically lost their German citizenship. Consequently, children resulting from these marriages would not have been German citizens at birth. Even after 1953, citizenship by descent was as a rule mostly transmitted patrilineally. Only children of married German fathers and unmarried German mothers received citizenship at birth until this was again amended in 1975. Furthermore, children of unmarried German fathers born since 1993 must have their paternity formally established; those born before 1993 were additionally required to have claimed citizenship before age 23 and must have been resident in Germany for three years at the time of application. Individuals who had lost citizenship or were ineligible for it as a direct result of this previous legislative gender imbalance have been able to acquire citizenship by declaration for a ten-year period that began on 20 August 2021. Successful applicants obtaining citizenship through this pathway are not required to renounce any alternative nationalities.

=== Naturalisation ===
Foreigners may naturalise as German citizens after legally residing in the country for at least five years. In practice, qualifying individuals usually possess a permanent residence permit or citizenship of an EU/EFTA country, though that is not strictly required. Applicants must demonstrate B1 proficiency in the German language, pass a citizenship test, declare loyalty to a free and democratic system, prove their self-sufficiency without state assistance, and hold no criminal record. Persons convicted of racist, antisemitic, or xenophobic acts are permanently barred from naturalisation.

The requisite period of residence may be reduced to three years for spouses of German citizens who have been married for at least two years. 168,775 individuals naturalised as German citizens in 2022, with 74.2 per cent of them retaining their previous nationalities after being granted a Beibehaltungsgenehmigung.

=== Reform of 2024 ===
In January 2024, the Bundestag passed a draft law that provides for the following reforms, among others:

- The residency requirement for naturalization will be reduced to five years. With "special integration efforts", naturalization is possible after just three years.
- Dual citizenship is generally possible.
- Children born in Germany to foreign parents in the future will be granted German citizenship without further reservation if at least one parent has been living legally in Germany for more than five years with the entitlement to reside in Germany indefinitely.

The Federal Council decided on 2 February 2024 not to call on the Mediation Committee (German: "Vermittlungsausschuss"). The Nationality Modernisation Act (German: "Staatsangehörigkeitsmodernisierungsgesetz") was promulgated on 26 March 2024. and, with two exceptions, came into force three months later, on 27 June 2024. Dual citizenship is now allowed without restrictions.

=== Relinquishment and deprivation ===
German nationality can be relinquished by making a declaration of renunciation, provided that the declarant already possesses another nationality. German children who are adopted by foreigners and acquire the nationality of their new parents automatically cease to be German at the time of adoption.

Citizenship may be stripped from a person who fraudulently acquired it within 10 years of that person having become a German citizen, or from dual nationals who engage in terrorist activities at any time or voluntarily serve in foreign armed forces without prior permission from the government. Since 6 July 2011, this permission is automatically granted to dual nationals of Australia, Israel, Japan, New Zealand, South Korea, and EU/EFTA or NATO countries who serve in the militaries of their alternate nationalities.

In May 2026, a recently naturalized man of Lebanese descent, had his German citizenship immediately revoked due to pro-Palestinian Instagram posts.

=== Reclamation of nationality revoked under Nazi rule ===
Any person who had their citizenship revoked between 30 January 1933 and 8 May 1945 on political, racial, or religious grounds, and their direct descendants, are entitled to reclaim German citizenship.

Until 2019, applicants qualified only if the primary claimant to German citizenship had that status rescinded through the Eleventh Decree to the Reich Citizenship Act (which stripped citizenship from all Jews domiciled abroad on 27 November 1941) or individually deprived under the 1933 Denaturalisation Act. These restrictions had prevented nationality restoration to: descendants of formerly German married women or unmarried fathers, children adopted before 1977 by qualified former German citizens, descendants of women who involuntarily lost German nationality after fleeing the country and marrying foreign men, and descendants of former Germans who applied for nationality renunciation before being stripped of their status.

These limitations were relaxed by ministerial decree by the Federal Ministry of the Interior and Community, by naturalising people otherwise eligible if not for the restrictions as normal applicants for Citizenship, with all requirements for naturalisation (including Language, Residence and Application Fees) waived by the Minister of the Interior.

The restrictions were fully lifted when codified into legislation in 2021 as Section 15 of the Nationality Act.

== See also ==
- Visa policy of the Schengen Area
- Visa requirements for German citizens
