= New German School of Alexandria =

International school in Alexandria, Egypt

New German School of Alexandria (German: Neue Deutsche Schule Alexandria, NDSA) is a German international school in Alexandria, Egypt. It operates preschool through high school.

It is recognised as a German school abroad by the Central Agency for German Schools Abroad (ZfA).

2006 is its year of establishment.
