= Visa requirements for German citizens =

Administrative entry restrictions

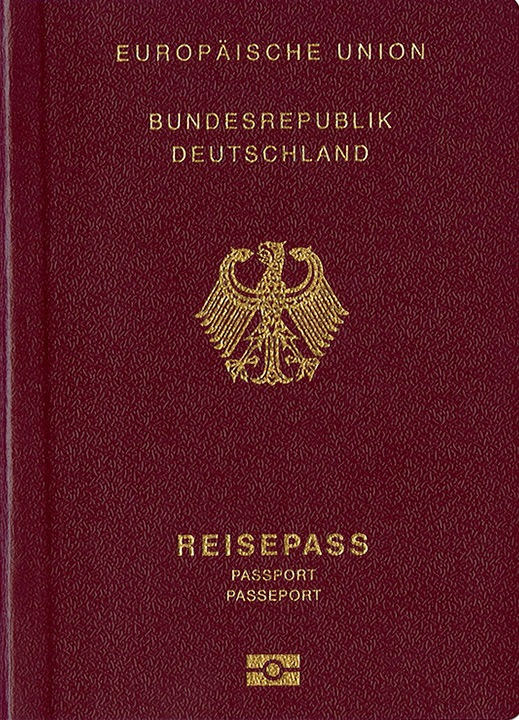
German passport cover (2017)

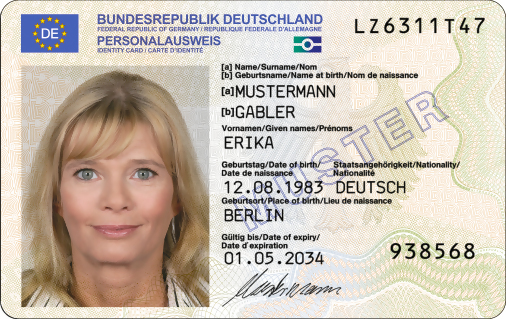
German identity card (2024), valid for travelling to most European countries.

Visa requirements for Germany citizens are administrative entry restrictions by the authorities of other states placed on citizens of Germany.

As of 2026, German citizens had visa-free or visa-on-arrival access to 185 countries and territories. According to the Henley Passport Index, the German passport ranked 4th in the world for travel freedom, tied for the highest ranking among all European Union member states alongside those of Belgium, Denmark, Finland, France, Ireland, Italy, Luxembourg, the Netherlands, and Spain.

== Recent ==
Recently visa requirements for German citizens were lifted by China (December 2023), Zambia (1 October 2022), Angola (September 2023), Tajikistan (January 2022), Oman (9 December 2020) (Previously Visa on arrival), Uzbekistan (15 January 2019), Cape Verde (1 January 2019), Belarus (February 2017), Solomon Islands (October 2016), Tuvalu (July 2016), Marshall Islands (June 2016), Palau (December 2015), Tonga (November 2015), Sao Tome and Principe (August 2015), Vietnam (July 2015-June 30, 2021 at least), Indonesia (June 2015), United Arab Emirates, Timor-Leste, Samoa (May 2015), Kazakhstan (July 2014), Mongolia (September 2013) and Kyrgyzstan (July 2012).

German citizens were made eligible for eVisas recently by Ghana (May 2026), Afghanistan (March 2026), Russia (2023), Guinea and Malawi (October 2019), Saudi Arabia (September 2019), Russia (only Kaliningrad Oblast, Saint Petersburg and Leningrad Oblast, free of charge), Suriname and Pakistan (April 2019), Tanzania and Papua New Guinea (November 2018), Djibouti (February 2018), Egypt (December 2017), Azerbaijan (January 2017), India (e-Tourist visa from November 2014) and Myanmar (September 2014).

== Visa requirements map ==
Map of jurisdictions by visa requirement for German citizens holding ordinary passports Germany Freedom of movement Visa not required / ETA (Note: ETA required for Australia, Canada if arriving by air, Israel, Kenya, Mozambique, New Zealand, Saint Kitts and Nevis, Seychelles, Sri Lanka, United Kingdom and the United States) (Note: Including Australian eVisitor.) Visa on arrival eVisa Visa available both on arrival or online (Note: Including Indonesian e-VOA.) Visa required prior to arrival

== Visa requirements ==
Country / Region	Visa requirement	Allowed stay	Notes (excluding departure fees)	Reciprocity
Afghanistan	eVisa	30 days	e-Visa : Visitors must arrive at Kabul International (KBL).	X
Albania	Visa not required	90 days	ID card valid.	✓
Algeria	Visa required		Persons may be denied entry if entering with a passport containing visas or stamps issued by Israel.; Visitors on tours organized to some southern regions by an approved travel agency may obtain a visa on arrival for up to 30 days.	✓
Andorra	Visa not required	90 days	ID card valid.	✓
Angola	Visa not required	30 days	30 days per trip, but no more than 90 days within any 1 calendar year for tourism purposes only.; Visitors must have a return/onward ticket and a hotel reservation confirmation.; An International Certificate of Vaccination is required.	X
Antigua and Barbuda	Visa not required	180 days		✓
Argentina	Visa not required	90 days		✓
Armenia	Visa not required	180 days		X
Australia	eVisitor	90 days	eVisitor is considered to be a visa under Australia law.; 90 days on each visit in 12-month period if granted.	✓
Austria	Freedom of movement	Unlimited stay	ID card valid.	✓
Azerbaijan	eVisa	30 days		X
Bahamas	Visa not required	90 days		✓
Bahrain	eVisa / Visa on arrival	14 days	Extendable for an additional 2 weeks.	X
Bangladesh	Visa on arrival	30 days		X
Barbados	Visa not required	90 days		✓
Belarus	Visa not required	90 days	Visa-free until 31 December 2026.	X
Belgium	Freedom of movement	Unlimited stay	ID card valid.	✓
Belize	Visa not required	30 days		X
Benin	eVisa	30 days	Must have an international vaccination certificate.; Three types of electronic visa are offered: the e-Visa valid for 30 days for a single entry (50 EUR), the e-Visa valid for 30 days for several (multiple) entries (75 EUR), and the e-Visa valid for 90 days to make several (multiple) entries (100 EUR).	X
Bhutan	eVisa	90 days	The Sustainable Development Fee (SDF) of 200 USD per person, per night for almost all visitors to Bhutan. Additionally, if payment is made in US dollars from September 1, 2023 to August 31, 2027, the SDF is 100 USD.	X
Bolivia	Visa not required	90 days		X
Bosnia and Herzegovina	Visa not required	90 days	90 days within any 6-month period.; ID card valid.	X
Botswana	Visa not required	90 days	90 days per calendar year.	X
Brazil	Visa not required	90 days	90 days within any 180-day period.	✓
Brunei	Visa not required	90 days		✓
Bulgaria	Freedom of movement	Unlimited stay	ID card valid.	✓
Burkina Faso	eVisa	90 days		X
Burundi	Online Visa / Visa on arrival	1 month		X
Cambodia	eVisa / Visa on arrival	30 days		X
Cameroon	eVisa			X
Canada	eTA / Visa not required	180 days	eTA required if arriving by air.	✓
Cape Verde	Visa not required (EASE)	30 days	Must register online at least five days prior to arrival.; Visitors must pay the Airport Security Fee (TSA) before visiting. The cost is 3,400 CVE (approx. 31 EUR) and can be paid via the online platform (EASE).	X
Central African Republic	Visa required			✓
Chad	eVisa	90 days	Must apply at least 7 days before arrival but maximum 90 days before arrival.	X
Chile	Visa not required	90 days		✓
China	Visa not required	30 days	Visa-free from December 1, 2023 to December 31, 2026.	X
Colombia	Visa not required	90 days	90 days; extendable up to 180-days stay within a one-year period.	✓
Comoros	Visa on arrival	45 days		X
Republic of the Congo	Visa required			✓
Democratic Republic of the Congo	eVisa	7 days		X
Costa Rica	Visa not required	180 days		X
Côte d'Ivoire	eVisa	3 months	e-Visa holders must arrive via Port Bouet Airport.	X
Croatia	Freedom of movement	Unlimited stay	ID card valid.	✓
Cuba	eVisa	90 days	Can be extended up to 90 days with a fee.	X
Cyprus	Freedom of movement	Unlimited stay	ID card valid.	✓
Czech Republic	Freedom of movement	Unlimited stay	ID card valid.	✓
Denmark	Freedom of movement	Unlimited stay	ID card valid.	✓
Djibouti	eVisa / Visa on arrival	90 days		X
Dominica	Visa not required	180 days		X
Dominican Republic	Visa not required	30 days	Application for a fee-based extension possible.	X
Ecuador	Visa not required	90 days		X
Egypt	eVisa / Visa on arrival	30 days	ID card valid, passport type photo is required on arrival.	X
El Salvador	Visa not required	90 days		✓
Equatorial Guinea	eVisa		e-Visa holders must arrive via Malabo International Airport.	X
Eritrea	Visa required			✓
Estonia	Freedom of movement	Unlimited stay	ID card valid.	✓
Eswatini	Visa not required	30 days		X
Ethiopia	eVisa / Visa on arrival	90 days	Visa on arrival is obtainable only at Addis Ababa Bole International Airport.; e-Visa holders must arrive via Addis Ababa Bole International Airport.; e-Visa is available for 30 or 90 days.	X
Fiji	Visa not required	120 days		X
Finland	Freedom of movement	Unlimited stay	ID card valid.	✓
France	Freedom of movement	Unlimited stay	ID card valid (including in Overseas France).	✓
Gabon	eVisa	90 days	e-Visa holders must arrive via Libreville International Airport.	X
Gambia	Visa not required	90 days		X
Georgia	Visa not required	360 days	ID card valid.	X
Ghana	eVisa	90 days		X
Greece	Freedom of movement	Unlimited stay	ID card valid.	✓
Grenada	Visa not required	90 days		✓
Guatemala	Visa not required	90 days		X
Guinea	eVisa	90 days		X
Guinea-Bissau	Visa on arrival	90 days		X
Guyana	Visa not required	90 days		X
Haiti	Visa not required	90 days		X
Honduras	Visa not required	90 days		X
Hungary	Freedom of movement	Unlimited stay	ID card valid.	✓
Iceland	Freedom of movement	Unlimited stay	ID card valid.	✓
India	eVisa	30 days	e-Visa holders must arrive via 32 designated airports (Note: Ahmedabad; Amritsar; Bagdogra; Bengaluru; Bhubaneswar; Chandigarh; Chennai; Coimbatore; Delhi; Gaya; Goa-Dabolim; Goa-Manohar; Guwahati; Hyderabad; Indore; Jaipur; Kannur; Kochi; Kolkata; Kozhikode; Lucknow; Madurai; Mangaluru; Mumbai; Nagpur; Port Blair; Pune; Surat; Thiruvananthapuram; Tiruchirappalli; Varanasi; Visakhapatnam) or 5 designated seaports. (Note: Chennai; Cochin; Mormugao (Goa); Mumbai; Mangalore); An Indian e-Tourist Visa may only be obtained twice within 1 calendar year.; Foreigners of Pakistani origin or who hold a Pakistani Passport are not eligible for an e-Visa. Foreigners who are not Pakistani nationals, but whose parents or grandparents (either paternal or maternal) were born in, or were permanent residents in Pakistan, are also not eligible for an e-Visa.; Former Indian citizens with an OCI (Overseas Citizen Of India) cards are eligible for unlimited travel and stay.	X
Indonesia	e-VOA / Visa on arrival	30 days	VoA fee of 500,000 IDR payable by card (Visa, Mastercard, JCB) only.; Extendable for 30 days.	X
Iran	eVisa	30 days	Passengers who have already made an application, at least 2 days before arrival, at the Iranian Ministry of Foreign Affair's e-Visa website and present the submission notification at the airport's visa desk may obtain a visa on arrival.	X
Iraq	eVisa	30 days	Visa on arrival or e-Visa for up to 30 days for travel to Iraqi Kurdistan.	X
Ireland	Freedom of movement	Unlimited stay	ID card valid.	✓
Israel	ETA-IL	90 days	3 months for tourism only.; German citizens born before 1 January 1928 need a visa which will be issued for free if one was not a member of the Nazi party or involved in crimes committed during the time of Nazi Germany.; Starting June 1st, 2024, the ETA-IL (Electronic Travel Authorisation) will open for application submissions as a pilot program for German and American citizens. Applying will be voluntary and exempt from fees. The system will open to other nationalities on July 1st, 2024.	✓
Italy	Freedom of movement	Unlimited stay	ID card valid.	✓
Jamaica	Visa not required	90 days		X
Japan	Visa not required	90 days	Extendable for 3 additional months.	✓
Jordan	eVisa / Visa on arrival		Visa on arrival for 40 JOD obtainable at most ports of entry, including land border crossings (except King Hussein/Allenby Bridge).; Visa is free of charge if entering and leaving through the Aqaba Special Economic Zone (ASEZA).	X
Kazakhstan	Visa not required	30 days		X
Kenya	Electronic Travel Authorisation	90 days	Applications can be submitted up to 90 days prior to travel and must be submitted at least 3 days in advance.; eTA fee is 32.50 USD.; Proof of reservation at the hotel where visitors plan to stay is required (if staying with friends, an invitation letter is also acceptable).; Yellow fever vaccination certificate is required if coming from endemic countries.	X
Kiribati	Visa not required	90 days		X
North Korea	Visa required			✓
South Korea	Visa not required	90 days	K-ETA exemption until the end of 2026.	✓
Kuwait	eVisa / Visa on arrival	90 days		X
Kyrgyzstan	Visa not required	30 days	30 days within any 60-day period.	X
Laos	eVisa / Visa on arrival	30 days	18 (Note: Savannakhet Airport; Lanetoui - Mengkang (China); Meuangmom - Wan Pong (Myanmar); Banvang - Ban Khok Phai (Thailand); Namngeun - Huay Kon (Thailand); Paksan - Bueng Kan (Thailand); Paktaphan - Pak Saeng (Thailand); Pangmon - Ban Huak (Thailand); Phoudou (Thailand); Dak ta ock - Nam Giang (Vietnam); La Lai (Vietnam); Namkan (Vietnam); Namphao - Cau Treo (Vietnam); Namsoy - Na Meo (Vietnam); Naphao - Cha Lo (Vietnam); Pahang - Long Sap (Vietnam); Panghok - Tây Trang (Vietnam); Phoukeua - Bo Y (Vietnam)) of the 33 border crossings are only open to regular visa holders.; e-Visa may be used to enter Laos through the Luang Prabang, Pakse and Vientiane international airports, 3 Thai-Lao Friendship Bridges (Note: Vientiane (Friendship Bridge 1); Savannakhet (Friendship Bridge 2); Bokeo (Friendship Bridge 4)), in Boten (road and railroad), and in Vientiane (at Khamsavath railway station).; Visa on arrival is available at the Luang Prabang, Pakse and Vientiane international airports, 4 Thai-Lao Friendship Bridges (Note: Vientiane (Friendship Bridge 1); Savannakhet (Friendship Bridge 2); Khammouane (Friendship Bridge 3); Bokeo (Friendship Bridge 4)) and 7 border crossings. (Note: Nongnokkheane - Trapeang Kriel (Cambodia); Boten - Bo han (China); Golden Triangle/Samliemkham (Thailand); Khamsavath railway station (Thailand); Namheuang - Ban Na Kraseng (Thailand); Vang tao - Chongmek (Thailand); Dansavan - Lao Bảo (Vietnam))	X
Latvia	Freedom of movement	Unlimited stay	ID card valid.	✓
Lebanon	Free visa on arrival	30 days	Extendable for 2 additional months.; Granted free of charge at Beirut International Airport or any other port of entry if there is no Israeli visa or seal, holding a telephone number, an address in Lebanon, and a non-refundable return or circle trip ticket.	X
Lesotho	Visa not required	14 days		X
Liberia	Visa required			✓
Libya	eVisa	30 days	Independent travel is not permitted, and visitors must organize their visit through a tour guide. A tourist police escort is required at all times.; An eVisa will not be granted without a sponsor or tour agency.; A security letter issued by the Libyan Immigration Authorities may also be required.; Holders of passports containing an Israeli stamp or visa will be refused entry in Libya.	X
Liechtenstein	Freedom of movement	Unlimited stay	ID card valid.	✓
Lithuania	Freedom of movement	Unlimited stay	ID card valid.	✓
Luxembourg	Freedom of movement	Unlimited stay	ID card valid.	✓
Madagascar	eVisa / Visa on arrival	90 days	For stays of 61 to 90 days, the visa fee is 59 USD.	X
Malawi	eVisa / Visa on arrival	30 days		X
Malaysia	Visa not required	90 days	The electronic Malaysia Digital Arrival Card must be submitted within three days before the date of arrival in Malaysia.	✓
Maldives	Free visa on arrival	30 days		X
Mali	Visa required			✓
Malta	Freedom of movement	Unlimited stay	ID card valid.	✓
Marshall Islands	Visa not required	90 days		✓
Mauritania	eVisa	30 days	An e-Visa is mandatory before travel.	X
Mauritius	Visa not required	90 days		X
Mexico	Visa not required	180 days		✓
Micronesia	Visa not required	90 days		✓
Moldova	Visa not required	90 days	90 days within any 180-day period.; ID card valid.	X
Monaco	Visa not required	3 months	ID card valid.	✓
Mongolia	Visa not required	30 days		X
Montenegro	Visa not required	90 days	ID card valid for 30 days.	X
Morocco	Visa not required	90 days		X
Mozambique	Electronic Travel Authorization	30 days	Visitors must register their ETA on the e-Visa platform at least 48 hours before travel and pay a processing fee of 48 USD.	X
Myanmar	eVisa	28 days	e-Visa holders must arrive via Yangon, Nay Pyi Taw or Mandalay airports or via land border crossings with Thailand — Tachileik, Myawaddy and Kawthaung or India — Rih Khaw Dar and Tamu.; e-Visa available for both tourism (allowed stay is 28 days) or business (allowed stay is 70 days) purposes.	X
Namibia	eVisa / Visa on arrival	90 days / 3 months	Can be obtained online or on arrival for a fee of N$1,600 (approximately €82 / US$88).	X
Nauru	Visa required			✓
Nepal	Online Visa / Visa on arrival	90 days		X
Netherlands	Freedom of movement (European Netherlands)	Unlimited stay	ID card valid.	✓
New Zealand	NZeTA	90 days	NZeTA is an electronic travel permit but not legally a visa.; May enter using eGate.; International Visitor Conservation and Tourism Levy must be paid upon requesting an Electronic Travel Authority.; Holders of an Australian Permanent Resident Visa or Resident Return Visa may be granted a New Zealand Resident Visa on arrival permitting indefinite stay (pursuant to the Trans-Tasman Travel Arrangement), subject to meeting character requirements and obtaining an Electronic Travel Authority prior to departure. Such travellers are not required to pay the International Visitor Conservation and Tourism Levy.	✓
Nicaragua	Visa not required	90 days		X
Niger	Visa required			✓
Nigeria	eVisa	30 days	Holders of written e-Visa approval issued by the Immigration Authority can obtain a visa on arrival, provided they hold a visa application form and e-Visa application payment receipt and have an invitation letter from a Nigerian company accepting immigration responsibilities.	X
North Macedonia	Visa not required	90 days	ID card valid.	X
Norway	Freedom of movement	Unlimited stay	ID card valid.	✓
Oman	Visa not required / eVisa	14 days / 30 days	An e-Visa is also available for stays up to 30 days.	X
Pakistan	eVisa	3 months		X
Palau	Visa not required	90 days		✓
Panama	Visa not required	90 days		✓
Papua New Guinea	eVisa	60 days	Available at Gurney Airport (Alotau), Mount Hagen Airport, Port Moresby Airport and Tokua Airport (Rabaul).	X
Paraguay	Visa not required	90 days		✓
Peru	Visa not required	90 days	90 days within any 6-month period.	✓
Philippines	Visa not required	30 days		X
Poland	Freedom of movement	Unlimited stay	ID card valid.	✓
Portugal	Freedom of movement	Unlimited stay	ID card valid.	✓
Qatar	Visa not required	90 days		X
Romania	Freedom of movement	Unlimited stay	ID card valid.	✓
Russia	eVisa	30 days		X
Rwanda	eVisa / Visa on arrival	30 days		X
Saint Kitts and Nevis	ETA	90 days	All travelers must apply for an ETA online.	✓
Saint Lucia	Visa not required	90 days		X
Saint Vincent and the Grenadines	Visa not required	90 days		X
Samoa	Visa not required	90 days		✓
San Marino	Visa not required	3 months	ID card valid.	✓
São Tomé and Príncipe	Visa not required	15 days		X
Saudi Arabia	eVisa / Visa on arrival	90 days	96 hour transit visa available additionally.	X
Senegal	Visa not required	90 days		X
Serbia	Visa not required	90 days	90 days within any 6-month period.; ID card valid.	X
Seychelles	Electronic Border System	90 days		✓
Sierra Leone	eVisa / Visa on arrival	30 days		X
Singapore	Visa not required	90 days		✓
Slovakia	Freedom of movement	Unlimited stay	ID card valid.	✓
Slovenia	Freedom of movement	Unlimited stay	ID card valid.	✓
Solomon Islands	Visa not required	90 days		✓
Somalia	eVisa	30 days	All visitors must have an approved Electronic Visa (eTAS) before the start of their journey.	X
South Africa	Visa not required	90 days		X
South Sudan	eVisa		Obtainable online 30 days single entry for 100 USD, 90 days multiple entry for 200 USD and 180 days multiple entry for 350 USD.; Printed visa authorization must be presented at the time of travel.	X
Spain	Freedom of movement	Unlimited stay	ID card valid.	✓
Sri Lanka	Electronic Travel Authorization	30 days	Sri Lanka introduced an ETA valid for 30 days.	X
Sudan	Visa required			✓
Suriname	Visa not required	90 days	An entrance fee of USD 50 or EUR 50 must be paid online prior to arrival.; Multiple entry e-Visa is also available.	X
Sweden	Freedom of movement	Unlimited stay	ID card valid.	✓
Switzerland	Freedom of movement	Unlimited stay	ID card valid.	✓
Syria	eVisa / Visa on arrival	30 days		X
Tajikistan	Visa not required	30 days		X
Tanzania	eVisa / Visa on arrival	90 days		X
Thailand	Visa not required	30 days	Maximum 2 visits annually if not arriving by air.	X
Timor-Leste	Visa not required	90 days		✓
Togo	eVisa	15 days		X
Tonga	Visa not required	90 days		X
Trinidad and Tobago	Visa not required	90 days		X
Tunisia	Visa not required	120 days		X
Turkey	Visa not required	90 days	ID card valid.; Former Turkish citizens with a Turkish "Blue Card" (Mavi Kart): Freedom of movement.	X
Turkmenistan	Visa required		10-day visa on arrival if holding a letter of invitation provided by a company registered in Turkmenistan with a prior approval from the Foreign Ministry. Visitors can apply to extend their stay for an additional 10 days.; When transiting between two non-bordering countries, visitors can obtain a Turkmenistan transit visa for a five-day stay. This must be applied for in advance at the Turkmenistan Embassy. Visitors must also submit copies of the visas for the country of entry into Turkmenistan and the country of departure from Turkmenistan. Visa fee is 20 USD.	✓
Tuvalu	Visa not required	90 days		✓
Uganda	eVisa	3 months		X
Ukraine	Visa not required	90 days	90 days within any 180-day period.	✓
United Arab Emirates	Visa not required	90 days	90 days within any 180-day period.	✓
United Kingdom	Electronic Travel Authorisation	6 months	ETA UK (valid for 2 years when issued) required from 2 April 2025.; Adults can use ePassport gates.	✓
United States	Visa Waiver Program	90 days	ESTA is valid for 2 years from the date of issuance.; ESTA is also required when entering the country by cruise ship or land.; A Form I-94 is required for entry into the United States by land. It carries a $30 fee and can be obtained either online or upon arrival.; Visa required for nationals of VWP countries who have travelled or been present in Iran, Iraq, Libya, North Korea, Somalia, Sudan, Syria or Yemen at any time on or after 1 March 2011 or Cuba at any time on or after 12 January 2021, or nationals of VWP countries who are also nationals of Iran, Iraq, North Korea, Sudan or Syria. Exceptions apply if the travel was in military or diplomatic service of the VWP country.	✓
Uruguay	Visa not required	90 days		✓
Uzbekistan	Visa not required	30 days		X
Vanuatu	Visa not required	90 days		X
Vatican City	Visa not required	1 day	ID card valid.	✓
Venezuela	Visa not required	90 days		X
Vietnam	Visa not required	45 days	A single entry e-Visa valid for 90 days is also available.	X
Yemen	Visa required		Yemen introduced an e-Visa system for visitors who meet certain eligibility requirements (group travel of 10 or more people, business trips, and transit etc.).	✓
Zambia	Visa not required	30 days	Also eligible for a universal visa allowing access to Zimbabwe.	X
Zimbabwe	eVisa / Visa on arrival	1 month	Also eligible for a universal visa allowing access to Zambia.	X

=== Requirements for entry to territories and states with limited recognition ===
Visa requirements for German citizens for visits to various territories, disputed areas and partially recognized countries:

Visitor to	Visa requirement	Allowed stay	Notes (excluding departure fees)
Europe
Abkhazia	Visa required		Tourists from all countries (except Georgia) can visit Abkhazia for a period not exceeding 24 hours as part of an organized tourist group.
Faroe Islands	Visa not required		ID card valid.
Gibraltar	Freedom of movement	Unlimited stay	ID card valid.
Guernsey	Visa not required	6 months	
Isle of Man	Visa not required	6 months	
(Norway) Jan Mayen	Permit required		Permit issued by the local police required for staying for less than 24 hours. Permit issued by the Norwegian police for staying for more than 24 hours.
Jersey	Visa not required	6 months	
Kosovo	Visa not required	90 days	ID card valid.
Northern Cyprus	Visa not required	3 months	ID card valid.
South Ossetia	Visa required		To enter South Ossetia, visitors must have a multiple-entry visa for Russia and register their stay with the Migration Service of the Ministry of Internal Affairs within 3 days.
Transnistria	Visa not required	45 days	ID card valid.; Visitors must complete and obtain a temporary migration card at the border checkpoint. The maximum period of stay is 45 days, and it can be extended multiple times through this card.
Africa
Ascension Island	eVisa		3 months within any year period.
British Indian Ocean Territory	Special permit required		Special permit required.
(Spain) Canary Islands	Freedom of movement	Unlimited stay	ID card valid.
(Portugal) Madeira	Freedom of movement	Unlimited stay	ID card valid.
Mayotte	Freedom of movement	Unlimited stay	ID card valid.
Réunion	Freedom of movement	Unlimited stay	ID card valid.
Saint Helena	Visa not required		
Tristan da Cunha	Permission required		Permission to land required for 15/30 pounds sterling (yacht/ship passenger) for Tristan da Cunha Island or 20 pounds sterling for Gough Island, Inaccessible Island or Nightingale Islands.
Sahrawi Arab Democratic Republic	Permit required		
Somaliland	Visa on arrival	30 days	30 days for 30 USD, payable on arrival.
Asia
(China) Hainan	Visa not required	30 days	
Hong Kong	Visa not required	90 days	
Iraqi Kurdistan	eVisa	30 days	
(Iran) Kish Island	Visa not required	14 days	Visitors to Kish Island do not require a visa.
Macao	Visa not required	90 days	
(Malaysia) Sabah and Sarawak	Visa not required		These states have their own immigration authorities and passport is required to travel to them, however the same visa applies.
Palestine	Visa not required		Arrival by sea to Gaza Strip not allowed.
Taiwan	Visa not required	90 days	
(Vietnam) Phú Quốc	Visa not required	30 days	
Caribbean and North Atlantic
Anguilla	Visa not required	3 months	
Aruba	Visa not required	30 days, extendable to 180 days	
(Portugal) Azores	Freedom of movement	Unlimited stay	ID card valid.
Bermuda	Visa not required	Up to 6 months, decided on arrival.	
(Netherlands) Bonaire, St. Eustatius and Saba	Visa not required	3 months	
British Virgin Islands	Visa not required	30 days, extensions possible	
Cayman Islands	Visa not required	6 months	
Curaçao	Visa not required	3 months	
Greenland	Visa not required		
Guadeloupe	Freedom of movement	Unlimited stay	ID card valid.
Martinique	Freedom of movement	Unlimited stay	ID card valid.
Montserrat	Visa not required	6 months	
Puerto Rico	Electronic System for Travel Authorization	90 days	Visa not required under the Visa Waiver Program, for 90 days on arrival from overseas for 2 years. ESTA required.
Saint Barthélemy	Visa not required	Unlimited stay	ID card valid.
Saint Martin	Freedom of movement	Unlimited stay	ID card valid (passport needed for the Dutch part of the island Sint Maarten).
Saint Pierre and Miquelon	Visa not required	Unlimited stay	ID card valid.
(Colombia) San Andrés and Leticia	Tourist Card on arrival		Visitors arriving at Gustavo Rojas Pinilla International Airport and Alfredo Vásquez Cobo International Airport must buy tourist cards on arrival.
Sint Maarten	Visa not required	3 months	
Turks and Caicos Islands	Visa not required	90 days	
U.S. Virgin Islands	Electronic System for Travel Authorization	90 days	Visa not required under the Visa Waiver Program, for 90 days on arrival from overseas for 2 years. ESTA required.
Oceania
American Samoa	Electronic authorization	30 days	
(Australia) Ashmore and Cartier Islands	Special authorisation required		Special authorisation required.
(France) Clipperton Island	Special permit required		Special permit required.
Cook Islands	Visa not required	31 days	
Guam	ESTA	90 days (same as US)	
New Caledonia	Freedom of movement		ID card valid.
Niue	Visa not required	30 days	
Northern Mariana Islands	ESTA	90 days	Visa not required under the Visa Waiver Program ESTA required.
Pitcairn Islands	Visa not required	14 days	Landing fee 35 USD or tax of 5 USD if not going ashore.
(France) French Polynesia	Visa not required	Unlimited stay	ID card valid.
Tokelau	Entry permit required		
United States Minor Outlying Islands	Special permits required		Special permits required for Baker Island, Howland Island, Jarvis Island, Johnston Atoll, Kingman Reef, Midway Atoll, Palmyra Atoll and Wake Island.
Wallis and Futuna	Visa not required	Unlimited stay	ID card valid.
South America
Argentina - Misiones Isla Apipé and Isla del Medio	Visa not required	90 days	By being Argentine territories, the same visa policy applies.
Galápagos	Pre-registration required	60 days	60 days; Visitors must pre-register to receive a 20 USD Transit Control Card (TCT).
South Atlantic and Antarctica
Falkland Islands	Visa not required	1 month	A visitor permit is normally issued as a stamp in the passport on arrival, The maximum validity period is 1 month.
South Georgia and the South Sandwich Islands	Permit required		Pre-arrival permit from the Commissioner required (72 hours/1 month for 110/160 pounds sterling).
British Antarctic Territory	Special permit required		
French Southern and Antarctic Lands	Special permits required		
Argentine Antarctica	Special permit required		
(Australia) Australian Antarctic Territory	Special permit required		
(New Zealand) Ross Dependency	Special permit required		
(Australia) Heard Island and McDonald Islands	Special permit required		
(Antártica Chilena Province) Chilean Antarctic Territory	Special permit required		
(Norway) Peter I Island	Special permit required		
(Norway) Queen Maud Land	Special permit required		

=== Special/Restricted areas ===
Special/Restricted Areas
Country	Area	Maximum stay	Details
China	Tibet Autonomous Region	TTP required	Tibet Travel Permit required (10 USD).
Cyprus (United Nations)	UN Buffer Zone in Cyprus	Access Permit required	Access Permit is required for travelling inside the zone, except Civil Use Areas. Access only possible from areas controlled by the Republic of Cyprus or the Sovereign Base Areas
Greece	Mount Athos	4 days	A special permit required (25 euro for Orthodox visitors, 35 euro for non-Orthodox visitors, 18 euro for students). There is a visitors' quota: maximum 100 Orthodox and 10 non-Orthodox per day and women are not allowed.
Eritrea	Travel outside Asmara	Travel permit required	To travel in the rest of the country, a Travel Permit for Foreigners is required (20 Eritrean nakfa).
Fiji	Lau Province	Special permission required	Special permission required.
India	Protected and restricted areas	PAP/RAP required	Protected Area Permit (PAP) required for whole states of Nagaland and Sikkim and parts of states Manipur, Arunachal Pradesh, Uttaranchal, Jammu and Kashmir, Rajasthan, Himachal Pradesh. Restricted Area Permit (RAP) required for all of Andaman and Nicobar Islands and parts of Sikkim. Some of these requirements are occasionally lifted for a year.
Kazakhstan	Town of Baikonur and surrounding areas in Kyzylorda Oblast, and the town of Gvardeyskiy	Special permission required	Special permission required for the town of Baikonur and surrounding areas in Kyzylorda Oblast, and the town of Gvardeyskiy near Almaty.
Maldives	Non-resort islands except Malé	Permission required	With the exception of the capital Malé, tourists are generally prohibited from visiting non-resort islands without the express permission of the Government of Maldives.
North Korea	Areas outside Pyongyang	Special permit required	People are not allowed to leave the capital city, tourists can only leave the capital with a governmental tourist guide (no independent moving)
Russia	Closed cities and regions in Russia	Special authorization required	Several closed cities and regions in Russia require special authorization.
Sudan	Travel outside of Khartoum	Travel permit required	All foreigners traveling more than 25 kilometers outside of Khartoum must obtain a travel permit.
Sudan	Darfur	Travel permit required	Separate travel permit is required.
Tajikistan	Gorno-Badakhshan Autonomous Province	OVIR permit required	OVIR permit required, can be obtained with e-visa application for an additional $20. Locally it may be obtained for 15+5 Tajikistani Somoni. Another special permit (free of charge) is required for Lake Sarez.
Turkmenistan	Atamurat, Cheleken, Dashoguz, Serakhs and Serhetabat	Special permit required	A special permit, issued prior to arrival by Ministry of Foreign Affairs, is required if visiting the following places: Atamurat, Cheleken, Dashoguz, Serakhs and Serhetabat.
Yemen	Travel outside Sanaa or Aden	Special permission required	Special permission needed for travel outside Sanaa or Aden.
(United Nations) Korean Demilitarized Zone		Restricted zone	
(United Nations) UNDOF Zone and Ghajar		Restricted zone	

== Vaccination requirements ==
=== Vaccination requirements map ===
Certain countries and territories require travellers arriving from Germany to be vaccinated against specific diseases. This is a map of vaccination requirements for German citizens and residents arriving directly from the Schengen area, excluding those arriving from third countries.

Vaccination requirements for travellers arriving from Germany Quadrivalent meningococcal vaccination (ACYW135) required (Note: Saudi Arabia: in the Hajj and Umrah zones only) Polio vaccination required Yellow fever vaccination required Vaccination not required

=== Quadrivalent meningococcal vaccination (ACYW135) ===
Meningococcal vaccination requirements for international travel
Country or territory	Details
Gambia	All travellers must show proof of vaccination with quadrivalent meningococcal vaccine (ACYW135) upon arrival.
Indonesia	Travellers arriving from or departing to Saudi Arabia must show proof of vaccination with quadrivalent ACYW-135.
Lebanon	Proof of vaccination with quadrivalent ACYW-135 is required for travellers departing Lebanon and going to Hajj, Umrah, and to certain African countries.
Libya	All travellers must show proof of vaccination with quadrivalent ACYW-135 upon arrival.
Philippines	Proof of vaccination with quadrivalent ACYW-135 is required for travellers going to Hajj and Umrah (in Saudi Arabia).
Saudi Arabia	Proof of vaccination is required for travellers 2 years of age and older who are Hajj or Umrah pilgrims and seasonal or pilgrim workers in Hajj and Umrah areas. Vaccination with quadrivalent ACYW135 (either polysaccharide or conjugate) must be issued not less than 10 days before arrival and not more than 3 years (polysaccharide vaccine) or 5 years (conjugate vaccine) before arrival. The immunisation certificate should clearly state if the traveller was vaccinated with the conjugate vaccine for the 5-year validity to apply.; Vaccination is also required for domestic pilgrims, residents of Mecca and Medina, and any persons participating in Hajj or Umrah or seasonal or pilgrimage work in Hajj and Umrah zones. At the discretion of the Ministry of Health, travellers may be administered prophylactic antibiotics upon arrival.

=== Polio vaccination ===
Polio vaccination requirements for international travel
Country	Details
Afghanistan	Travellers from polio-endemic countries (Pakistan) need Carte Jaune proof of polio vaccination (received between 4 weeks and 12 months before departure) upon arrival. Residents and ALL travellers staying in Afghanistan longer than 4 weeks need proof of polio vaccination (received between 4 weeks and 12 months before departure) when departing from Afghanistan.
Belize	Travellers from Afghanistan and Pakistan need Carte Jaune proof of OPV or IPV vaccination (received between 4 weeks and 12 months before departure) upon arrival. Belize residents travelling countries with confirmed polio cases also need proof of vaccination.
Brunei	Travellers from polio-exporting countries need Carte Jaune proof of OPV or IPV vaccination (received between 4 weeks and 12 months before departure) upon arrival.
Egypt	Travellers from Afghanistan, Angola, Benin, Cameroon, the Central African Republic, China, Congo-Kinshasa, Ethiopia, Ghana, Indonesia, Kenya, Mozambique, Myanmar, Niger, Nigeria, Pakistan, Papua New Guinea, Philippines, and Somalia need Carte Jaune proof of OPV or IPV vaccination (received between 4 weeks and 12 months before departure) upon arrival.
Georgia	Travellers from at-risk countries need Carte Jaune proof of OPV or IPV vaccination (received between 4 weeks and 12 months before departure) upon arrival. Travellers without proof are offered OPV vaccination upon arrival.
India	Travellers from Afghanistan, Congo-Kinshasa, Ethiopia, Kenya, Nigeria, Pakistan, Somalia, and Syria need Carte Jaune proof of OPV or IPV vaccination (received between 4 weeks and 12 months before departure) upon arrival.
Iran	Travellers from Afghanistan, Pakistan, and Nigeria need Carte Jaune proof of OPV or IPV vaccination (received between 4 weeks and 12 months before departure) upon arrival. Travellers without proof will be vaccinated upon arrival.
Iraq	Travellers aged 15+ from Afghanistan and Pakistan need Carte Jaune proof of OPV or IPV vaccination (received between 4 weeks and 12 months before departure) upon arrival; children under age 15 must have received three doses of polio vaccine before travel. Travellers without proof will be vaccinated upon arrival. Travellers departing Iraq to Afghanistan and Pakistan must also provide proof of vaccination upon departure.
Jordan	Travellers from Afghanistan and Pakistan need Carte Jaune proof of OPV or IPV vaccination (received between 4 weeks and 12 months before departure) upon arrival.
Lebanon	Travellers from and to polio-affected countries need Carte Jaune proof of OPV or IPV vaccination (received between 4 weeks and 12 months before departure) upon arrival.
Libya	Travellers from Afghanistan and Pakistan need Carte Jaune proof of OPV or IPV vaccination (received between 4 weeks and 12 months before departure) upon arrival.
Maldives	Travellers from and to polio-exporting countries, as well as Hajj and Umrah pilgrims, need Carte Jaune proof of OPV or IPV vaccination (received between 4 weeks and 12 months before departure) upon arrival.
Morocco	Travellers from polio-affected countries need Carte Jaune proof of OPV or IPV vaccination (received between 4 weeks and 12 months before departure) upon arrival.
Nepal	Travellers from Afghanistan, Kenya, Nigeria, Pakistan, and Papua New Guinea need Carte Jaune proof of OPV or IPV vaccination (received between 4 weeks and 12 months before departure) upon arrival.
Oman	Travellers from polio-exporting countries need Carte Jaune proof of OPV or IPV vaccination (received between 4 weeks and 12 months before departure) upon arrival.
Pakistan	Travellers from ALL countries planning to stay in Pakistan for more than 4 weeks need Carte Jaune proof of OPV vaccination upon arrival. Residents and ALL travellers staying in Pakistan longer than 4 weeks need proof of OPV vaccination when departing from Pakistan.
Philippines	Travellers from or to high-risk countries need Carte Jaune proof of polio vaccination upon arrival or before departure, respectively. Due to an ongoing local VDPV2 outbreak, the government recommends all others travellers to consider getting a polio vaccine or booster dose, depending on their situation.
Qatar	Travellers from polio-exporting countries (identified by Qatar as: Afghanistan, Nigeria, Pakistan and Philippines) need Carte Jaune proof of OPV or IPV vaccination (received between 4 weeks and 12 months before departure) upon arrival.
Saint Kitts and Nevis	Travellers from polio-endemic countries as identified by WHO (Afghanistan and Pakistan) need Carte Jaune proof of OPV or IPV vaccination (received between 4 weeks and 12 months before departure) upon arrival.
Saudi Arabia	Travellers from active-transmission (including wild or vaccine-derived poliovirus) and at-risk countries, as well as all travellers from Afghanistan, Congo-Kinshasa, Mozambique, Myanmar, Niger, Nigeria, Pakistan, Papua New Guinea, Somalia, Syria, and Yemen, need Carte Jaune proof of OPV or IPV vaccination (received between 4 weeks and 12 months before departure) upon arrival. Regardless of immunisation status, all travellers from Afghanistan, Myanmar, Nigeria, Pakistan, Papua New Guinea, Somalia, Syria, and Yemen will be given an Oral Polio Vaccine dose upon arrival.
Seychelles	Travellers from countries with polio outbreaks need Carte Jaune proof of OPV or IPV vaccination (received between 4 weeks and 12 months before departure) upon arrival.
Syria	Travellers from Cameroon, Equatorial Guinea, and Pakistan need Carte Jaune proof of OPV or IPV vaccination (received between 4 weeks and 12 months before departure) upon arrival. ALL Syria residents departing Syria to any country also need proof of vaccination.
Ukraine	Long-term visitors departing to states with wild or circulating vaccine-derived poliovirus transmission should present Carte Jaune proof of vaccination with at least one dose of bivalent OPV or IPV (received between 4 weeks and 12 months before departure). Persons obliged to undertake urgent international travel must be immunised with a single dose of polio vaccine before their departure. There is also risk of poliovirus transmission inside Ukraine itself, and travellers to Ukraine are recommended to be up to date with their polio vaccination before entry.

=== Yellow fever vaccination ===
Yellow fever vaccination requirements for international travel (July 2019)
Country or territory	Status	Vaccination required for travellers coming from	Traveller age
Albania	No risk	Risk countries	1 year or older
Algeria	No risk	Risk countries (Note: Also required for travellers having transited more than 12 hours through a risk country's airport.)	1 year or older
Angola	Risk country	All countries	9 months or older
Antigua and Barbuda	No risk	Risk countries	1 year or older
Argentina	Risk provinces: Misiones, Corrientes	No (Note: The WHO has designated (parts of) Argentina, Brazil and Peru as risk countries, but these countries do not require incoming travellers to vaccinate against yellow fever.)	–
Aruba	No risk	Risk countries	9 months or older
Australia	No risk	Risk countries	1 year or older
Bahamas	No risk	Risk countries	1 year or older
Bahrain	No risk	Risk countries	9 months or older
Bangladesh	No risk	Risk countries (Note: Also required for travellers having transited any time through a risk country's airport.)	1 year or older
Barbados	No risk	Risk countries	1 year or older
Belize	No risk	Risk countries	1 year or older
Benin	Risk country	Risk countries	1 year or older
Bolivia	Risk country	Risk countries	1 year or older
Bonaire	No risk	Risk countries	9 months or older
Botswana	No risk	Risk countries	1 year or older
Brazil	Risk country	No	–
Brunei	No risk	Risk countries	9 months or older
Burkina Faso	Risk country	Risk countries	9 months or older
Burundi	Risk country	Risk countries	9 months or older
Cabo Verde	No risk	Risk countries	1 year or older
Cambodia	No risk	Risk countries	1 year or older
Cameroon	Risk country	All countries	9 months or older
Central African Republic	Risk country	All countries	9 months or older
Chad	Risk country	All countries	9 months or older
China	No risk	Risk countries	9 months or older
Christmas Island	No risk	Risk countries	1 year or older
Colombia	Risk country	Risk countries	1 year or older
Congo-Brazzaville	Risk country	All countries	9 months or older
Congo-Kinshasa	Risk country	All countries	9 months or older
Costa Rica	No risk	Risk countries	9 months or older
Côte d'Ivoire	Risk country	All countries	9 months or older
Cuba	No risk	Risk countries	9 months or older
Curaçao	No risk	Risk countries	9 months or older
Dominica	No risk	Risk countries	1 year or older
Dominican Republic	No risk	Risk countries	1 year or older
Ecuador	Risk country	Risk countries	1 year or older
Egypt	No risk	Risk countries	9 months or older
El Salvador	No risk	Risk countries	1 year or older
Equatorial Guinea	Risk country	Risk countries	9 months or older
Eritrea	No risk	Risk countries	9 months or older
Eswatini	No risk	Risk countries	9 months or older
Ethiopia	Risk country	Risk countries	9 months or older
Fiji	No risk	Risk countries	1 year or older
French Guiana	Risk country	All countries	1 year or older
French Polynesia	No risk	Risk countries	9 months or older
Gabon	Risk country	All countries	1 year or older
Gambia	Risk country	Risk countries	9 months or older
Ghana	Risk country	All countries	9 months or older
Grenada	No risk	Risk countries	1 year or older
Guadeloupe	No risk	Risk countries	1 year or older
Guatemala	No risk	Risk countries	1 year or older
Guinea	Risk country	Risk countries	9 months or older
Guinea-Bissau	Risk country	All countries	1 year or older
Guyana	Risk country	Risk countries	1 year or older
Haiti	No risk	Risk countries	1 year or older
Honduras	No risk	Risk countries	1 year or older
India	No risk	Risk countries	9 months or older
Indonesia	No risk	Risk countries	9 months or older
Iran	No risk	Risk countries	9 months or older
Iraq	No risk	Risk countries	9 months or older
Jamaica	No risk	Risk countries	1 year or older
Jordan	No risk	Risk countries	1 year or older
Kenya	Risk country	Risk countries	1 year or older
Kyrgyzstan	No risk	Risk countries	1 year or older
Laos	No risk	Risk countries	Unknown
Lesotho	No risk	Risk countries	6 months or older
Liberia	Risk country	Risk countries	9 months or older
Libya	No risk	Risk countries	1 year or older
Madagascar	No risk	Risk countries	9 months or older
Malawi	No risk	Risk countries	1 year or older
Malaysia	No risk	Risk countries	1 year or older
Maldives	No risk	Risk countries	9 months or older
Mali	Risk country	All countries	1 year or older
Malta	No risk	Risk countries	9 months or older
Martinique	No risk	Risk countries	1 year or older
Mauritania	Risk country	Risk countries	1 year or older
Mayotte	No risk	Risk countries	1 year or older
Montserrat	No risk	Risk countries	1 year or older
Mozambique	No risk	Risk countries	9 months or older
Myanmar	No risk	Risk countries	1 year or older
Namibia	No risk	Risk countries	9 months or older
Nepal	No risk	Risk countries	1 year or older
New Caledonia	No risk	Risk countries	1 year or older
Nicaragua	No risk	Risk countries	1 year or older
Niger	Risk country	All countries	1 year or older
Nigeria	Risk country	All countries	9 months or older
Niue	No risk	Risk countries	9 months or older
North Korea	No risk	Risk countries	1 year or older
Oman	No risk	Risk countries	9 months or older
Pakistan	No risk	Risk countries	1 year or older
Panama	Risk country	Risk countries	1 year or older
Papua New Guinea	No risk	Risk countries	1 year or older
Paraguay	Risk country	Risk countries	1 year or older
Peru	Risk country	No	–
Philippines	No risk	Risk countries	1 year or older
Pitcairn Islands	No risk	Risk countries	1 year or older
Rwanda	No risk	Risk countries	1 year or older
Saint Barthélemy	No risk	Risk countries	1 year or older
Saint Helena	No risk	Risk countries	1 year or older
Saint Kitts and Nevis	No risk	Risk countries	1 year or older
Saint Lucia	No risk	Risk countries	9 months or older
Saint Martin	No risk	Risk countries	1 year or older
Saint Vincent and the Grenadines	No risk	Risk countries	1 year or older
Samoa	No risk	Risk countries	1 year or older
São Tomé and Príncipe	No risk	Risk countries	1 year or older
Saudi Arabia	No risk	Risk countries	1 year or older
Senegal	Risk country	Risk countries	9 months or older
Seychelles	No risk	Risk countries	1 year or older
Sierra Leone	Risk country	All countries	Unknown
Singapore	No risk	Risk countries	1 year or older
Sint Eustatius	No risk	Risk countries	6 months or older
Sint Maarten	No risk	Risk countries	9 months or older
Solomon Islands	No risk	Risk countries	9 months or older
Somalia	No risk	Risk countries	9 months or older
South Africa	No risk	Risk countries	1 year or older
South Sudan	Risk country	All countries	9 months or older
Sri Lanka	No risk	Risk countries	9 months or older
Sudan	Risk country	Risk countries	1 year or older
Suriname	Risk country	Risk countries	1 year or older
Tanzania	No risk	Risk countries	1 year or older
Thailand	No risk	Risk countries	1 year or older
Togo	Risk country	All countries	9 months or older
Trinidad and Tobago	Risk region: Trinidad	Risk countries	1 year or older
Uganda	Risk country	All countries	1 year or older
United Arab Emirates	No risk	Risk countries	9 months or older
Venezuela	Risk country	Risk countries	1 year or older
Wallis and Futuna	No risk	Risk countries	1 year or older
Zambia	No risk	Risk countries	1 year or older
Zimbabwe	No risk	Risk countries	9 months or older

=== COVID-19 vaccination ===
Many countries increasingly consider the vaccination status of travellers with regard to quarantine requirements or when deciding to allow them entry at all. This is justified by research that shows that the Pfizer vaccine effect lasts for six months or so.

== Passport requirements ==
=== Passport not required ===
German identity card is valid for these countries:

- EU and Europe (including Gibraltar and except Belarus, Russia, the United Kingdom [for tourism] and Ukraine)
- Egypt (passport type photo is required on arrival)
- (France) French overseas territories (passport needed if the direct flight has a scheduled intermediate landing in a country that requires a passport)
- Georgia
- Tunisia (on package holidays)
- Turkey
- United Kingdom - individuals with pre-settled or settled status, frontier-worker permits and S2 Healthcare Visitors - until at least 31 December 2025.

=== Blank passport pages ===
Many countries require a minimum number of blank pages to be available in the passport being presented, typically one or two pages. Endorsement pages, which often appear after the visa pages, are not counted as being valid or available.

=== Passport validity length ===
Many countries require passports to be valid for at least 6 months upon arrival and one or two blank pages.

Countries requiring passports to be valid at least 6 months on arrival include Afghanistan, Algeria, Bangladesh, Bhutan, Botswana, Brunei, Cambodia, Comoros, Côte d'Ivoire, Ecuador, Egypt, El Salvador, Fiji, Guyana, Haiti, Indonesia, Iran, Iraq (except when arriving at Basra – 3 months and Erbil or Sulaimaniyah – on arrival), Jordan, Kenya, Kiribati, Kuwait, Laos, Libya, Madagascar, Malaysia, Marshall Islands, Mauritania, Mongolia, Myanmar, Namibia, Nicaragua, Nigeria, Oman, Palau, Papua New Guinea, Philippines, Rwanda, Samoa, Saudi Arabia, Singapore, Solomon Islands, Somalia, Sri Lanka, Sudan, Suriname, Syria, Taiwan, Tanzania, Timor-Leste, Tonga, Tuvalu, Uganda, United Arab Emirates, Vanuatu, Venezuela, Vietnam, Yemen.

Turkey usually requires passports to be valid for at least 5 months (150 days) upon entry, but for German citizens Turkish authorities allow to enter even with passport or identity card expired within last year.

Countries requiring passport validity of at least 4 months on arrival include Azerbaijan, Micronesia, Zambia.

Countries requiring passport validity of at least 3 months on arrival include Albania, Bosnia and Herzegowina, Honduras, Moldova, Nauru, North Macedonia, Panama, Qatar, Senegal and French territories in the Pacific (i.e. French Polynesia, New Caledonia and Wallis and Futuna)

Countries requiring passport validity of at least 1 month on arrival include Eritrea, Hong Kong, Lebanon, Macau, Maldives, New Zealand, South Africa

Other countries require either a passport valid on arrival or passport valid throughout the period of intended stay.

=== Medical passport ===
Many African countries, including Benin, Burkina Faso, Burundi, Cameroon, Central African Republic, Democratic Republic of the Congo, Republic of the Congo, Côte d'Ivoire, Gabon, Guinea-Bissau, Kenya, Liberia, Niger, Rwanda, Sierra Leone and Togo, require all incoming passengers older than nine months to one year to have a current International Certificate of Vaccination or Prophylaxis, as does the South American territory of French Guiana.

== Entry bans ==
=== Criminal record ===
Some countries, including Australia, Canada, Fiji, New Zealand and the United States, routinely deny entry to non-citizens who have a criminal record, while others impose restrictions depending on the type of conviction and the length of the sentence.

=== Persona non grata ===
The government of a country can declare a diplomat persona non grata, banning them from entering the country or expelling them if they have already entered. In non-diplomatic use, the authorities of a country may also declare a foreigner persona non grata permanently or temporarily, usually because of unlawful activity.

=== Israeli stamps ===
Kuwait, Lebanon, Libya, and Yemen do not allow entry to people with passport stamps from Israel or whose passports have either a used or an unused Israeli visa, or where there is evidence of previous travel to Israel such as entry or exit stamps from neighbouring border posts in transit countries such as Jordan and Egypt.

To circumvent this Arab League boycott of Israel, the Israeli immigration services have now mostly ceased to stamp foreign nationals' passports on either entry to or exit from Israel (unless the entry is for some work-related purposes). Since 15 January 2013, Israel no longer stamps foreign passports at Ben Gurion Airport. Passports are still (as of 22 June 2017) stamped at Erez when passing into and out of Gaza.

Iran refuses admission to holders of passports containing an Israeli visa or stamp that is less than 12 months old.

== Biometrics ==
Several countries mandate that all travellers, or all foreign travellers, be fingerprinted on arrival and will refuse admission to or even arrest travellers who refuse to comply. In some countries, such as the United States, this may apply even to transit passengers who merely wish to change planes rather than go landside.

Fingerprinting countries/regions include Afghanistan, Argentina, Brunei, Cambodia, China, Ethiopia, Ghana, Guinea, India, Japan, Kenya (both fingerprints and a photo are taken), Malaysia upon entry and departure, Mongolia, Saudi Arabia, the Schengen Area, Singapore, South Korea, Taiwan, Thailand, Uganda, the United Arab Emirates and the United States.

Many countries also require a photo be taken of people entering the country. The United States, which does not fully implement exit control formalities at its land frontiers (although long mandated by its own legislation), intends to implement facial recognition for passengers departing from international airports to identify people who overstay their visa.

Together with fingerprint and face recognition, iris scanning is one of three biometric identification technologies internationally standardised since 2006 by the International Civil Aviation Organization (ICAO) for use in e-passports and the United Arab Emirates conducts iris scanning on visitors who need to apply for a visa. The United States Department of Homeland Security has announced plans to greatly increase the biometric data it collects at US borders. In 2018, Singapore began trials of iris scanning at three land and maritime immigration checkpoints.

== Right to consular protection in non-EU countries ==
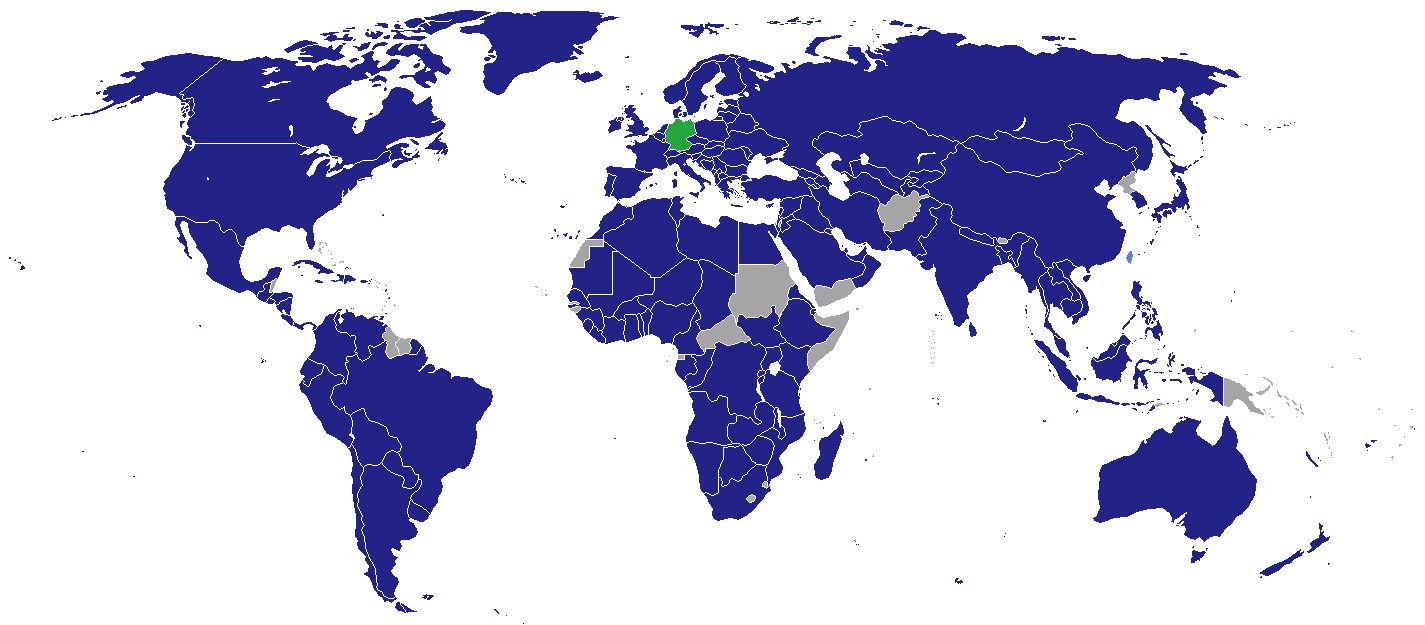
Diplomatic missions of Germany

In a non-EU country where there is no German embassy, German citizens, like all other EU citizens, have the right to get consular protection from the embassy of any other EU country present in that country.

See also List of diplomatic missions of Germany.

== See also ==
- Visa policy of the Schengen Area
- German identity card
- German passport
