= Main Post Office in Jakarta =

Building in Indonesia

Coordinates: 6°10′02″S 106°50′02″E

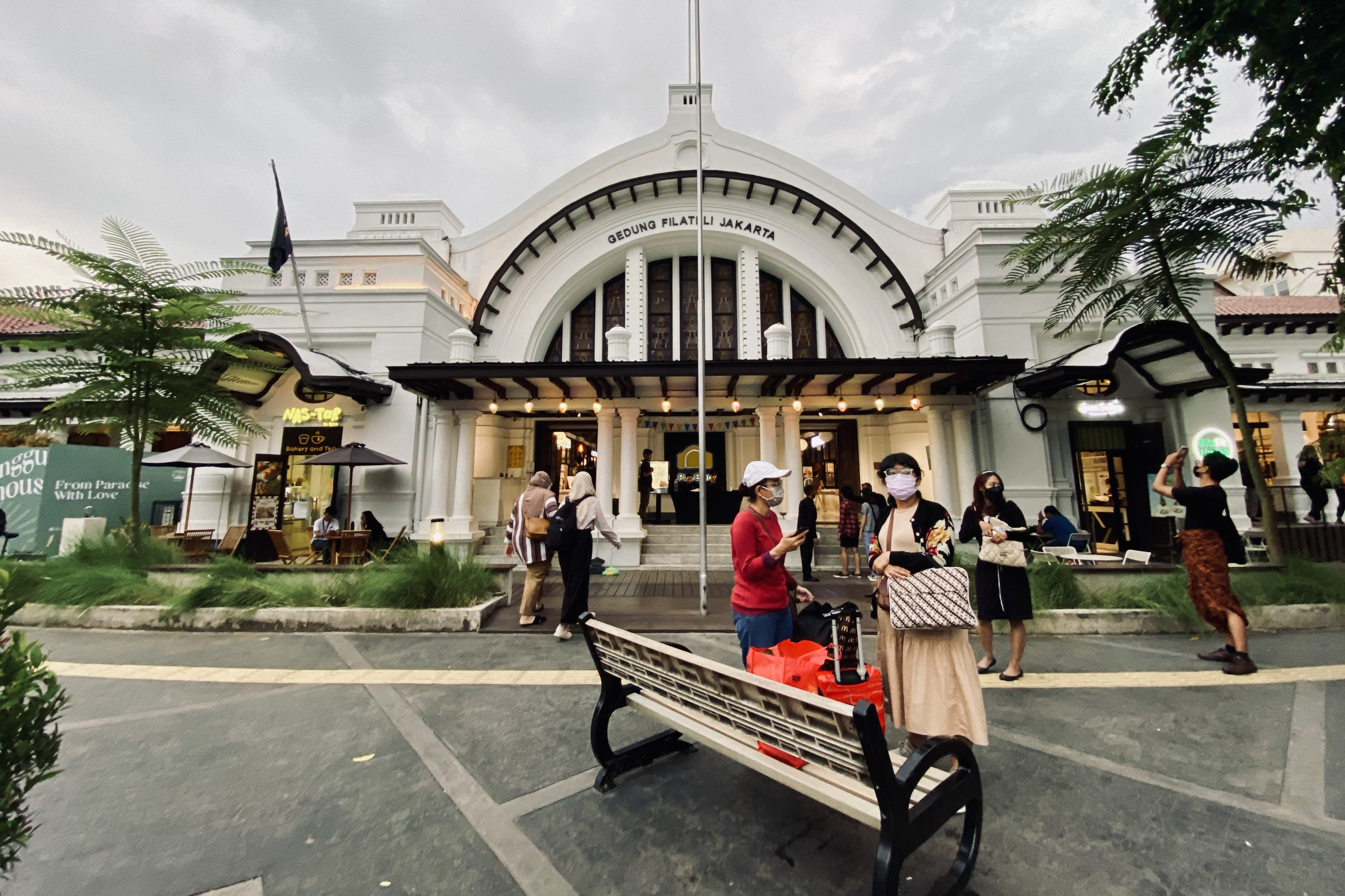
The main post office with the building at the front (now named Pos Bloc)

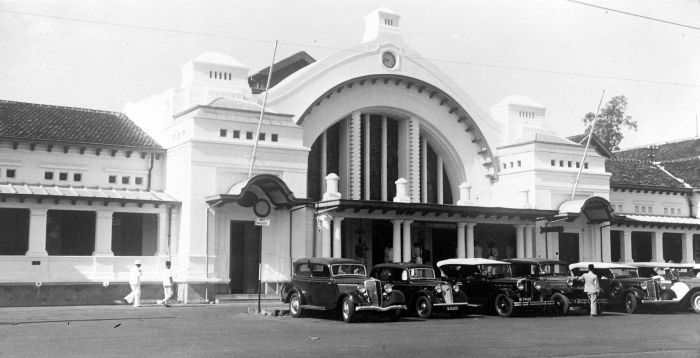
The post office in 1938

The Main Post and Telegraph Office, formerly Weltevreden Postkantoor and Filateli Jakarta is now Pos Bloc, it is a historic building in Weltevreden, Jakarta, Indonesia. It was designed by J van Hoytema and built in 1913. It is located next to St. Ursula Catholic School and near the Jakarta Cathedral and Istiqlal Mosque (Independence Mosque).
