= Santa Ursula BSD School =

School in South Tangerang, Banten, Indonesia

St.. Ursula School Bumi Serpong Damai
- Indonesia

Information
- Type: Private Catholic Co-educational Pre K-12
- Motto: Serviam 'I serve'
- Established: 1990
- Principal: Kindergarten: Stefannie Monika Sulaiman Primary: Dominika Eni Widyastuti Junior High School: Cicilia Budilestari High School: Catur Agus Sancoko
- Grades: Pre-Kindergarten – Year 12
- Colours: Green and White
- Website: www.sanurbsd-tng.sch.id

St. Ursula BSD is a Catholic private school, from Pre-kindergarten to Year 12, located in Bumi Serpong Damai, South Tangerang, Indonesia. The school was established in 1990. St. Ursula BSD is coeducational, different from St. Ursula Girls' School in Jakarta, Indonesia. Their logo called Serviam means "I serve". St. Ursula BSD is one of the top Catholic schools in Tangerang, often ranked among the best high schools in the country.

== History ==
Since 1857, the Ursuline Sisters began working in Indonesia with the location in Juanda Street. Two years later, they expanded service in Road No. Pos. 2 Jakarta. Works in the School of Education is a major field of apostolate. In addition, they also developed other forms of devotion, between communities and cooperation in the field of pastoral.

Seeing the needs of education in Bumi Serpong Damai as an independent city, St. Ursula worked by establishing school education in 1990 with the construction starting at the same year.

=== School building phases ===
Building of the school began on July of 1990, as the first phase began with the building of three rooms that were used for the kitchen, lunchroom, and the teacher's lounge. It was at that time too when the foundation built half of the primary School building, which are the classrooms for the 1st and 2nd grades, as well as kindergarten. The building phase finished a year after.

Phase two building began around the same time after the finishing of the first phase, building 18 rooms for kindergarten and primary school by the July of 1992 to start phase 3, which aimed to build the primary school building until 6th grade, finishing the next year. Because there were many grade 5 students, the administration thought to build a junior high school building, taking yet another year to finish.

Shortly after that, high school was also built in three phases. The fifth, sixth, and seventh phases took one year each.

== Curriculum ==
Since 2022, St. Ursula BSD uses 'Merdeka Curriculum' and students haven't taken the Indonesian National Exams since 2016, opting to use the Computer-Based National Assessment until 2025, when it was replaced by the Academic Ability Test. Other than that, there are also partnerships with non-profit organizations such as Goethe-Institut, Domus Cordis, and many others. They also used to collaborate with the Armed Forces and Navy for yearly programs, with the earliest records being in 2015, when the scouts boarded KRI Tanjung Kambani. Another example would be their 'Fisik Mental' program, working with local military units, a few examples being the Yon Arhanud 1(Rajawali) and Yonif Arya Kemuning 203.

== Extracurriculars and performances ==
The students perform musicals every year, but students have to audition for a part in the musical. Other than that, open house events happen around once or twice per year, with schedules and contents of school activities, clubs, extracurriculars, and talkshows. All students regardless of membership of the student council are allowed to participate as staff to help organize with teachers or help visitors for tours and locations.

Other than that, they also compete in championships and matches in E-sports, football, basketball, and volleyball, and at times they create their competitions, with the newest edition being Ursa Cup in 2026, inviting other high schools such as the Jakarta Girls' School and Sinarmas World Academy.

There are a variety of extracurriculars in each of the school's unit, with the most being the high school, with 38 classes. Each student in junior high to high school must have 2 ECA, while students in primary school mandates one. The Kindergarten tier, though having extracurricular classes, does not mandate that students have one.

In kindergarten, there are five extracurriculars, which are:

- Karate Kids,
- Art Learning,
- Hip Hop Dance,
- Musical Choir, and
- Little Chef.

The limit of the students allowed in are averaged around 20.

== Facilities ==
St Ursula provides many facilities to support students activities in sport, music, science labs, school computers, libraries, air conditioned class, smart board, and many more.

Facilities In Each Building:

Kindergarten:

- Classroom with Smart Board and AC
- Computer Room
- Interactive Room with Active Board
- Audio Visual
- Library
- Play Room
- Playground
- Swimming Pool
- Medical Bay
- Mini Gym
- Hall
- Auditorium
- Garden
- Parking Zone
- CCTV
- Wi-Fi
- Toilets

Primary School:

- Classroom with Interactive Smart Board dan AC
- Computer Room
- Interactive Room with Active Board
- Library
- Hall
- Sports field: Badminton & Basketball
- Parking Zone
- CCTV
- Wi-Fi
- Toilets

Junior High School:

- Classroom with Smart Board and AC
- Language Laboratory
- Computer Room
- Multimedia
- Library
- Audio Visual
- Kitchen
- Hall
- Sports field: Basketball, Volleyball, and Badminton
- Canteen
- Hydroponics Room
- CCTV
- Wi-Fi
- Toilets

High School:

- Classroom with Smart Board and AC
- Physics, Biology, and Chemistry Laboratories
- Language Laboratory
- E - Learning Room
- Student Council Room
- Multimedia
- Audio Visual
- Computer Room
- Library
- Hall
- Sports field: Basketball, Volleyball, Badminton, and Long Jump
- Kitchen
- Canteen
- CCTV
- Wi-Fi
- Toilets

== Buildings ==
St. Ursula BSD buildings to support school activities:

- Pre-kindergarten and kindergarten building
- Primary school building (year 1–6)
- Secondary school building (year 7–12)
- Sporthall (Gym) & Multifunctional Room
- Auditorium

== Notable alumni ==
- Melvin Laurel Puka, product manager of Krom Bank Indonesia
