= Federal Office of Administration =

Coordinates: 50.9700°N 6.9705°E

- Bundesverwaltungsamt (BVA)

Agency overview
- Formed: 14 January 1960 (66 years ago)
- Superseding agency: Bundesstelle für Verwaltungsangelegenheiten
- Jurisdiction: Government of Germany
- Headquarters: Cologne, North Rhine-Westphalia
- Employees: 6,000
- Annual budget: 739,684,000 Euro (2026)
- Agency executive: Katja Wilken, President
- Parent department: Federal Ministry of the Interior (Germany)
- Website: https://www.bundesverwaltungsamt.de

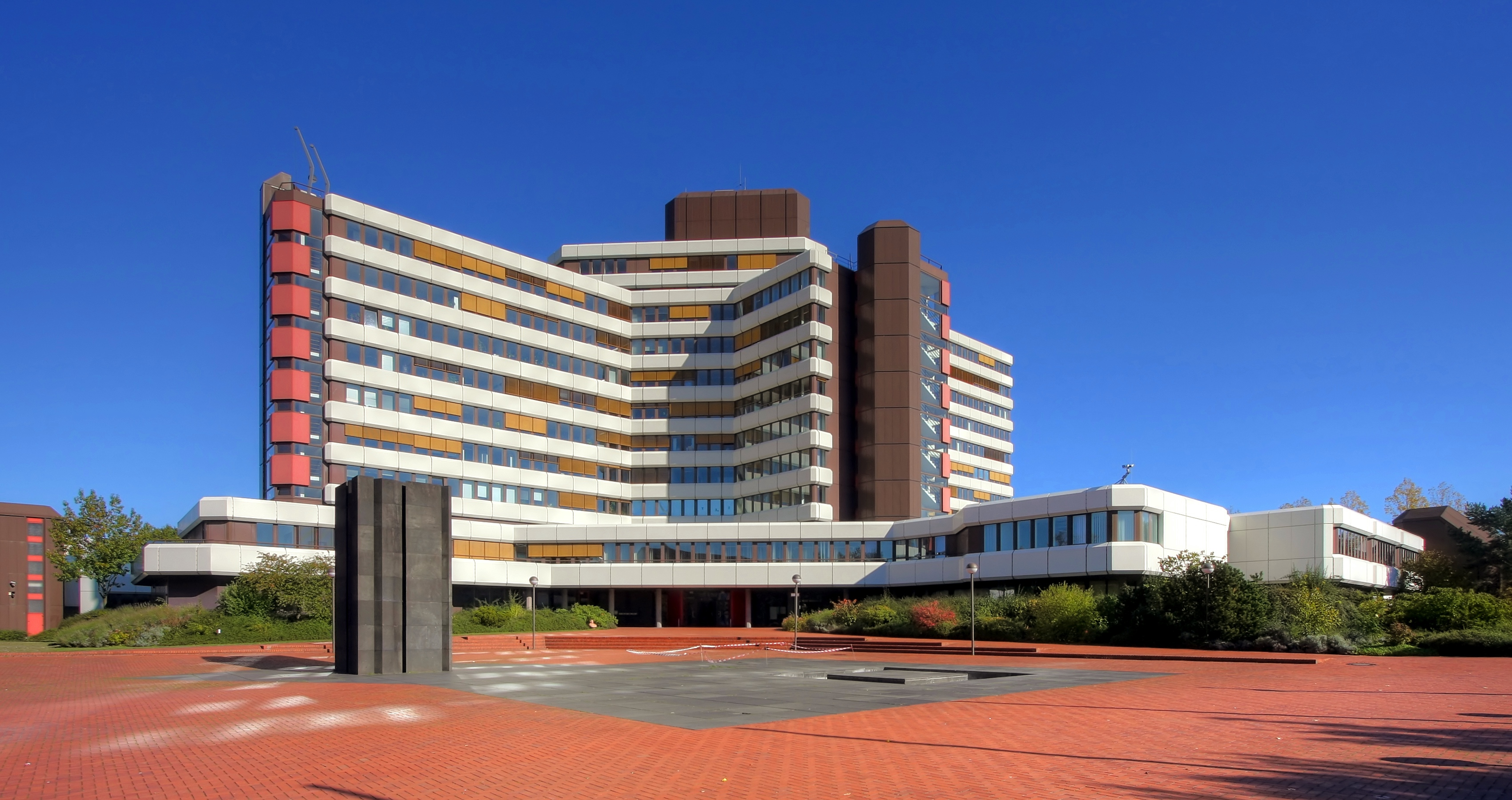
Head office

The Federal Office of Administration (German: Bundesverwaltungsamt, BVA) is an agency of the Federal Ministry of the Interior, headquartered in Cologne. The agency is tasked with a wide variety of responsibilities, including, for example, the collection of German federal student loans, so called BAföG, as well as the administration of German nationality law for people outside of Germany.

== See also ==
- Central Agency for German Schools Abroad, an agency
