= Central Agency for German Schools Abroad =

Agency of the Federal Office of Administration

The German Central Agency for German Schools Abroad (German: Zentralstelle für das Auslandsschulwesen, ZfA) is an agency of the Federal Office of Administration, itself an agency of the Federal Ministry of the Interior, that operates and manages schools for German children outside of Germany. The ZfA supports over 1,200 schools worldwide, including more than 140 German schools abroad, and approximately 1,100 schools in the respective educational system in which the German Language Certificate (DSD) can be acquired.

Schools that are a part of the ZfA network primarily serve children of expatriates working at embassies or consulates, for offices of German multinational companies, and/or who live in major centers of economic and/or political operations. Many also serve communities with ties to other German-speaking countries, such as Austria and Switzerland. Schools in some locations emphasize ties to Germany and/or Germans, while others emphasize international connections and education and promote their instruction of the German language. Nowadays, three out of four pupils of German schools abroad are from the respective host countries or other cultures. In North America many schools emphasize ties to Germany, with some offering Saturday-only programmes.

== See also ==
- Agency for French Education Abroad (AEFE) – The French equivalent
- Deutsches Sprachdiplom Stufe I and II
