= Namibian passport =

Passport issued to citizens of Namibia

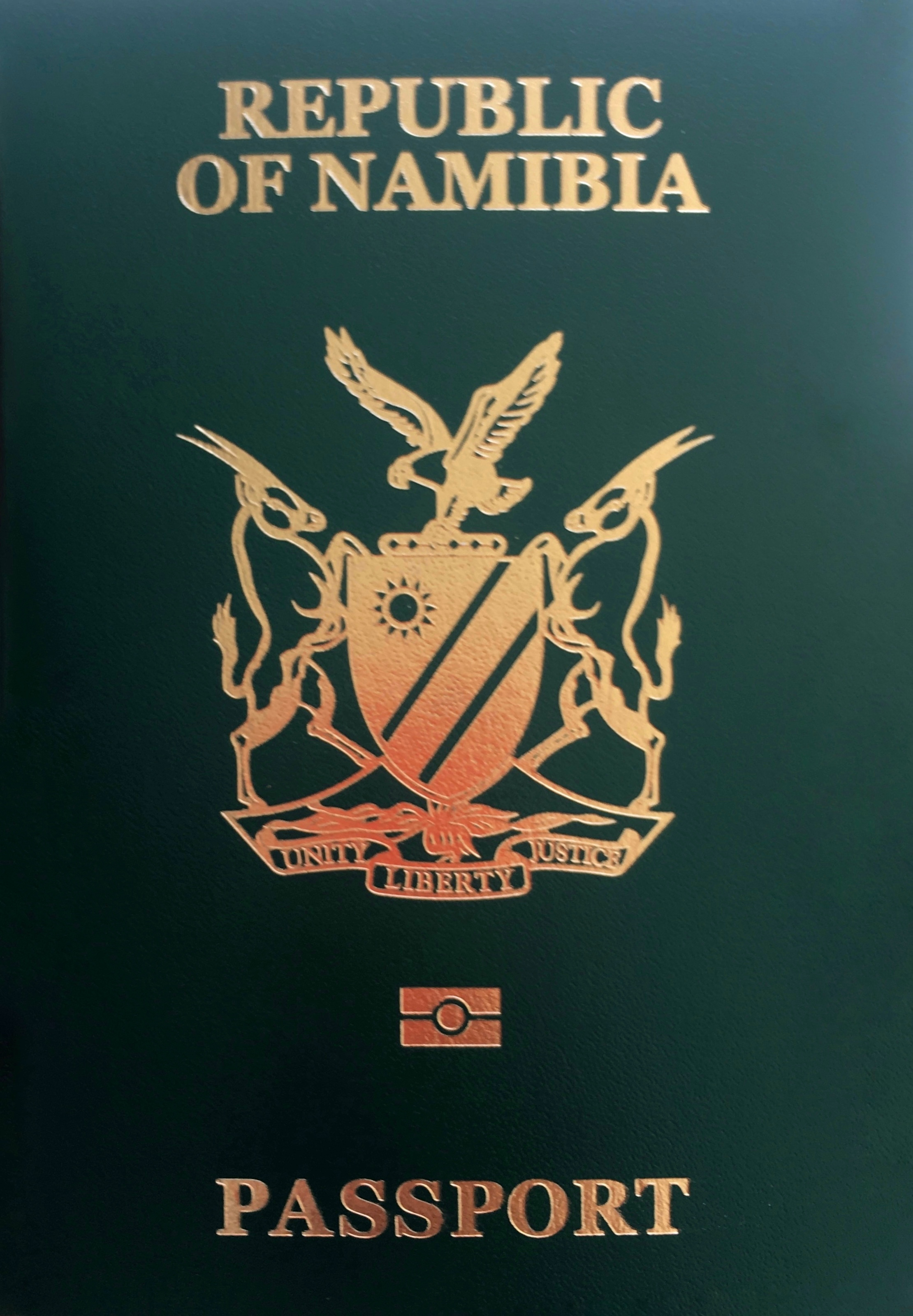
- Front cover of an ordinary Namibian biometric passport (with chip)
- Type: Passport
- Issued by: Namibia
- First issued: 1990 (first version); January 2018 (biometric version)
- Purpose: Identification and travel
- Eligibility: Namibian citizenship or permanent residency
- Expiration: 10 years after issuance
- Cost: N$400

Namibian passports are travel documents issued to citizens and permanent residents of the Republic of Namibia for identification and international travel. They are exclusively issued by the Ministry of Home Affairs and Immigration.

Ordinary Namibian passports are green, with the national coat of arms emblazoned on the front cover. The diplomatic passports are red, while the official passports are blue. "REPUBLIC OF NAMIBIA" is inscribed above the representation of the coat of arms, and "PASSPORT" is inscribed below. (All are written in capital letters in a Thames-Serial style font.) The Biometric logo also appears above "PASSPORT". All information in the passport is printed in English, with the photo page also translated into French. There are three types of passport booklets: the ordinary passport, the official passport, and the diplomatic passport.

Visa requirements for Namibian citizens Namibia Visa free access Visa on arrival eVisa Visa available both on arrival or online Visa required

== History ==
The first Namibian passports were introduced in 1990, shortly after the country gained its independence from South Africa. In 2006, old handwritten passports were phased out in a move to fight off identity fraud. In January 2018, a new biometric passport type was introduced; existing non-biometric passports issued until said date continue to be valid until expired.

== Namibian passport power ==
As of 2025, Namibian citizens had visa-free or visa on arrival access to 80 countries and territories, ranking the Namibian passport 68th most powerful in the world according to the Henley Passport Index.

== Identification page ==
- Passport holder photo (Width: 37mm, Height: 52mm, Head height (up to the top of the hair): 70%; Distance from the top of the photo to the top of the hair: 8%)
- Type ("P" for passport)
- Code of the country
- Serial number of the passport
- Surname and first name of the passport holder
- Citizenship
- Date of birth
- Gender (M for men or F for women)
- Place of Birth
- Date of issuance
- Expiry date
- Issuing authority
- Passport holder's signature
- Machine-readable code

== Renewal abroad ==
Namibian passports can be renewed abroad. Renewal is available only if the current passport has less than 1 year validity left. Full list of documents and fees depends on each local embassy or consulate. The processing time of renewal a Namibian passport abroad is usually 1-3 months.

== Gallery of historic images ==
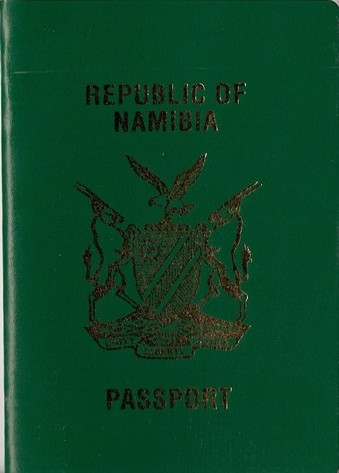
Namibian non-biometric passport (1990–2017)

== See also ==
- List of passports
- Visa requirements for Namibian citizens
