= Bundesdruckerei =

German banknote printing company

Coordinates: 52°30′27″N 13°24′05″E

Bundesdruckerei GmbH
- Company type: GmbH
- Industry: IT systems and services, identification systems, secure printing
- Predecessor: Königlich Preußische Staatsdruckerei
- Founded: 6 July 1879
- Headquarters: Berlin, Germany
- Key people: Stefan Hofschen (CEO); Christian Helfrich (CFO)
- Revenue: ▲EUR 773,996,139 (2021)
- Net income: ▲EUR 79,332,709 (2021)
- Number of employees: 3,338 (2021)
- Website: www.bundesdruckerei.de

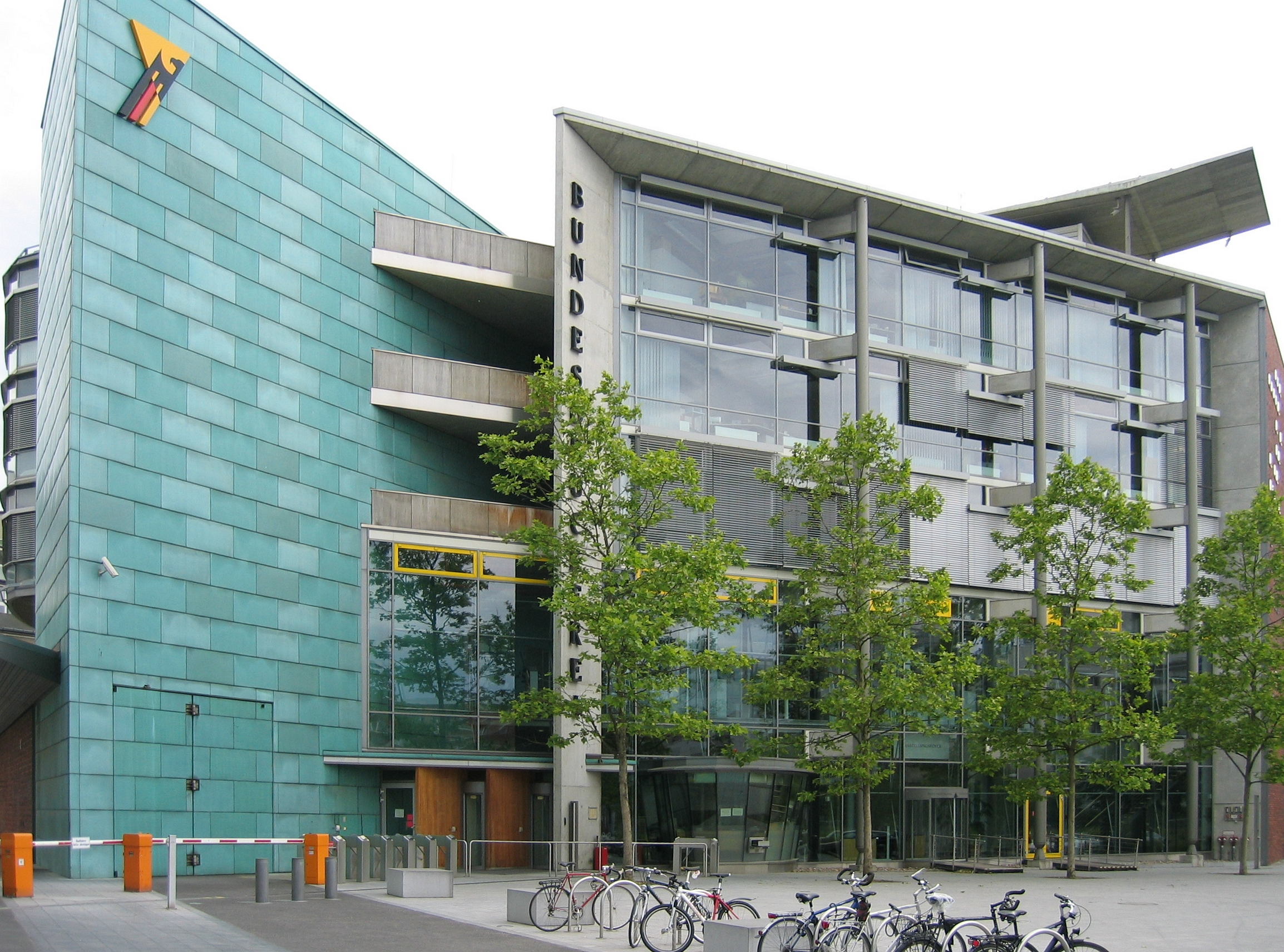
Headquarters of the Bundesdruckerei in Berlin

Former logo, used from 2009 until 2018

Bundesdruckerei (lit. 'Federal Press', short form: BDr) is a German company that produces documents and devices for secure identification and offers corresponding services. It is based in the Berlin district of Kreuzberg. Its portfolio includes complete passport and ID card systems, the security printing house also offers ID documents, high-security cards, document checking devices, security software and trust center services. Bundesdruckerei also produces banknotes, stamps, visas, vehicle documents, tobacco revenue stamps and electronic publications.

== History ==
The company was founded as Reichsdruckerei ("Reich press") in 1879 and operated under this name until 1945. The Ottoman Halid Hamid reported in 1918 that the print was of remarkable quality and they were even able to print Egyptian hieroglyphs in prints for Museums in Egypt. The company also printed in a variety of scripts such as Cyrillic, Georgian, Armenian, Arabic, Kurdish or Syriac among others.

In 1951, the company was renamed Bundesdruckerei. After it became privatised in 1994, the company expanded operations into digital security and secure identification services. In 2009 it became a state-owned enterprise again.

In September 2014, Bundesdruckerei succeeded, in a case referred to the European Court of Justice, in obtaining a preliminary ruling that the City of Dortmund could not require tenderers for a document digitalisation contract to commit to paying German minimum wage levels to the workforce when they were intending to sub-contract the performance of the contract to a firm based in Poland outside the scope of the German minimum wage law.

The following year, Bundesdruckerei won the tender to provide the International Civil Aviation Organization Public Key Directory (ICAO PKD).

== See also ==
- Österreichische Staatsdruckerei - the corresponding agency in Austria
- Orell Füssli - the corresponding agency in Switzerland
