= PKD =

PKD may stand for:

== Biology and medicine ==
- Paroxysmal kinesigenic dyskinesia, a movement disorder
- Polycystic kidney disease
- PKD1 and PKD2, human genes
- Proliferative kidney disease, caused by the parasite Tetracapsuloides
- Pyruvate kinase deficiency

== Transport ==
- ICAO PKD, the International Civil Aviation Organization Public Key Directory
- Parkdale railway station, Melbourne

== Other uses ==
- Philip K. Dick (1928–1982), American science fiction writer
- Pi Kappa Delta, a forensics honor society
- Proto-Kra–Dai language
