= Visa requirements for Namibian citizens =

Administrative entry restrictions

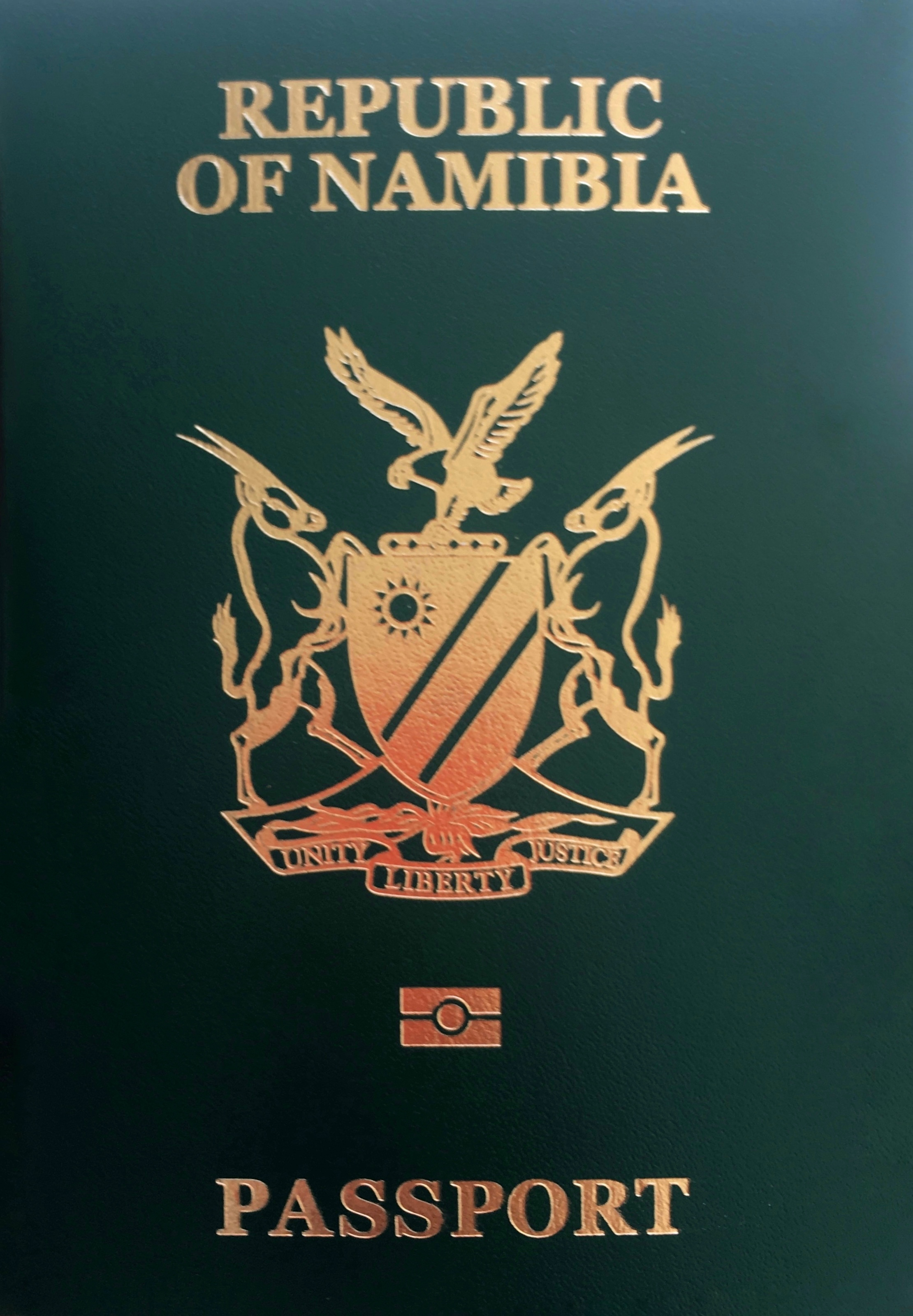
Namibian passport

Visa requirements for Namibian citizens are administrative entry restrictions by the authorities of other states placed on citizens of Namibia.

As of 2026, Namibian citizens have visa-free or visa on arrival access to 74 countries and territories, ranking the Namibian passport 61st in the world according to the Henley Passport Index.

On 24 May 2024, the Government of Namibia announced that it will introduce a reciprocal visa regime.

== Visa requirements map ==
Visa requirements for Namibian citizens holding ordinary passports Namibia Visa not required Visa on arrival eVisa Visa available both on arrival or online Visa required

== Visa requirements ==
| Country | Visa requirement | Allowed stay | Notes (excluding departure fees) |
|---|---|---|---|
| Afghanistan | eVisa | 30 days | Visa is not required in case born in Afghanistan or can proof that one of their parents is a national of Afghanistan or born in Afghanistan.; e-Visa : Visitors must arrive at Kabul International (KBL). |
| Albania | eVisa | | Visa is not required for Holders of a valid multiple-entry Schengen, UK or US visa has been previously used once or residence permit of Schengen, UK, US or UAE 10 years. |
| Algeria | Visa required | | |
| Andorra | Visa required | | |
| Angola | Visa not required | | |
| Antigua and Barbuda | Visa not required | 1 month | |
| Argentina | Visa required | | Electronic Travel Authorization must be approved before travel and is valid for tourism purposes if holding a valid category B2/J/B1/O/P (P1-P2-P3)/E/H-1B visa issued by the United States of America. |
| Armenia | Visa required | | |
| Australia and territories | Visa required | | May apply online (Online Visitor e600 visa). |
| Austria | Visa required | | |
| Azerbaijan | Visa required | | |
| Bahamas | Visa not required | 3 months | |
| Bahrain | eVisa / Visa on arrival | 14 days | |
| Bangladesh | Visa on arrival | 30 days | |
| Barbados | Visa not required | 90 days | |
| Belarus | Visa required | | Visa-free for 30 days for holders of a Schengen visa or a national visa of country of EU, must arrive via Minsk International Airport. |
| Belgium | Visa required | | |
| Belize | Visa not required | | |
| Benin | Visa not required | 90 days | |
| Bhutan | eVisa | | |
| Bolivia | Online Visa / Visa on arrival | 30 days | |
| Bosnia and Herzegovina | Visa required | | |
| Botswana | Visa not required | 90 days | ID Card valid. |
| Brazil | Visa not required | 90 days | |
| Brunei | Visa required | | |
| Bulgaria | Visa required | | |
| Burkina Faso | eVisa | | |
| Burundi | Visa on arrival | 1 month | |
| Cambodia | eVisa / Visa on arrival | 30 days | |
| Cameroon | eVisa | | |
| Canada | Visa required | | |
| Cape Verde | Visa on arrival | | |
| Central African Republic | Visa required | | |
| Chad | eVisa | | |
| Chile | Visa required | | |
| China | Visa required | | |
| Colombia | Online Visa | | |
| Comoros | Visa on arrival | 45 days | |
| Republic of the Congo | Visa required | | |
| Democratic Republic of the Congo | eVisa | 7 days | |
| Costa Rica | Visa required | | |
| Côte d'Ivoire | eVisa | 3 months | |
| Croatia | Visa required | | |
| Cuba | Visa not required | | |
| Cyprus | Visa required | | |
| Czech Republic | Visa required | | |
| Denmark | Visa required | | |
| Djibouti | eVisa | 90 days | |
| Dominica | Visa not required | 6 months | |
| Dominican Republic | Visa not required | | |
| Ecuador | Visa not required | 90 days | |
| Egypt | Visa required | | |
| El Salvador | Visa required | | |
| Equatorial Guinea | eVisa | | |
| Eritrea | Visa required | | |
| Estonia | Visa required | | |
| Eswatini | Visa not required | 30 days | |
| Ethiopia | eVisa / Visa on arrival | up to 90 days | Visa on arrival is obtainable only at Addis Ababa Bole International Airport.; e-Visa holders must arrive via Addis Ababa Bole International Airport.; e-Visa is available for 30 or 90 days. |
| Fiji | Visa required | | |
| Finland | Visa required | | |
| France | Visa required | | |
| Gabon | eVisa | 90 days | e-Visa holders must arrive via Libreville International Airport. |
| Gambia | Visa not required | 90 days | Must obtain an entry clearance from the Gambian Immigration prior to travel. |
| Georgia | eVisa | 30 days | |
| Germany | Visa required | | |
| Ghana | Visa on arrival | 30 days | |
| Greece | Visa required | | |
| Grenada | Visa not required | 3 months | |
| Guatemala | Visa required | | |
| Guinea | Visa not required | 90 days | |
| Guinea-Bissau | Visa on arrival | 90 days | |
| Guyana | Visa required | | |
| Haiti | Visa not required | 3 months | |
| Honduras | Visa required | | |
| Hungary | Visa required | | |
| Iceland | Visa required | | |
| India | eVisa | 30 days | e-Visa holders must arrive via 32 designated airports (Note: Ahmedabad; Amritsar; Bagdogra; Bengaluru; Bhubaneswar; Chandigarh; Chennai; Coimbatore; Delhi; Gaya; Goa-Dabolim; Goa-Manohar; Guwahati; Hyderabad; Indore; Jaipur; Kannur; Kochi; Kolkata; Kozhikode; Lucknow; Madurai; Mangaluru; Mumbai; Nagpur; Port Blair; Pune; Surat; Thiruvananthapuram; Tiruchirappalli; Varanasi; Visakhapatnam) or 5 designated seaports. (Note: Chennai; Cochin; Mormugao (Goa); Mumbai; Mangalore); An Indian e-Tourist Visa may only be obtained twice within 1 calendar year.; Foreigners of Pakistani origin or who hold a Pakistani Passport are not eligible for an e-Visa. Foreigners who are not Pakistani nationals, but whose parents or grandparents (either paternal or maternal) were born in, or were permanent residents in Pakistan, are also not eligible for an e-Visa. |
| Indonesia | Visa required | | |
| Iran | eVisa | 30 days | |
| Iraq | eVisa | | |
| Ireland | Visa required | | |
| Israel | Visa required | | |
| Italy | Visa required | | |
| Jamaica | Visa not required | 180 days | |
| Japan | Visa required | | |
| Jordan | Visa required | | |
| Kazakhstan | eVisa | | |
| Kenya | Visa not required | 90 days | |
| Kiribati | Visa not required | 90 days | |
| North Korea | Visa required | | |
| South Korea | Visa required | | |
| Kuwait | Visa required | | |
| Kyrgyzstan | eVisa | 60 days | |
| Laos | eVisa / Visa on arrival | 30 days | 18 (Note: Savannakhet Airport; Lanetoui - Mengkang (China); Meuangmom - Wan Pong (Myanmar); Banvang - Ban Khok Phai (Thailand); Namngeun - Huay Kon (Thailand); Paksan - Bueng Kan (Thailand); Paktaphan - Pak Saeng (Thailand); Pangmon - Ban Huak (Thailand); Phoudou (Thailand); Dak ta ock - Nam Giang (Vietnam); La Lai (Vietnam); Namkan (Vietnam); Namphao - Cau Treo (Vietnam); Namsoy - Na Meo (Vietnam); Naphao - Cha Lo (Vietnam); Pahang - Long Sap (Vietnam); Panghok - Tây Trang (Vietnam); Phoukeua - Bo Y (Vietnam)) of the 33 border crossings are only open to regular visa holders.; e-Visa may be used to enter Laos through the Luang Prabang, Pakse and Vientiane international airports, 3 Thai-Lao Friendship Bridges (Note: Vientiane (Friendship Bridge 1); Savannakhet (Friendship Bridge 2); Bokeo (Friendship Bridge 4)), in Boten (road and railroad), and in Vientiane (at Khamsavath railway station).; Visa on arrival is available at the Luang Prabang, Pakse and Vientiane international airports, 4 Thai-Lao Friendship Bridges (Note: Vientiane (Friendship Bridge 1); Savannakhet (Friendship Bridge 2); Khammouane (Friendship Bridge 3); Bokeo (Friendship Bridge 4)) and 7 border crossings. (Note: Nongnokkheane - Trapeang Kriel (Cambodia); Boten - Bo han (China); Golden Triangle/Samliemkham (Thailand); Khamsavath railway station (Thailand); Namheuang - Ban Na Kraseng (Thailand); Vang tao - Chongmek (Thailand); Dansavan - Lao Bảo (Vietnam)) |
| Latvia | Visa required | | |
| Lebanon | Visa required | | In addition to a visa, an approval should be obtained from the Immigration department of the General Directorate of General Security (La Surete Generale). |
| Lesotho | Visa not required | 90 days | |
| Liberia | Visa required | | |
| Libya | eVisa | | |
| Liechtenstein | Visa required | | |
| Lithuania | Visa required | | |
| Luxembourg | Visa required | | |
| Madagascar | eVisa / Visa on arrival | 60 days | |
| Malawi | Visa not required | 90 days | |
| Malaysia | Visa not required | | |
| Maldives | Free visa on arrival | 30 days | |
| Mali | Visa required | | |
| Malta | Visa required | | |
| Marshall Islands | Visa required | | |
| Mauritania | eVisa | | Available at Nouakchott–Oumtounsy International Airport. |
| Mauritius | Visa not required | 90 days | |
| Mexico | Visa required | | Visa is not required for Holders of a valid visa of Canada, US, UK or a Schengen State and Permanent residence of Canada, Chile, Colombia, Schengen State, Japan, UK, US; Entry may be refused by immigration officials for individuals who were previously denied a US visa, even if holding a valid Mexican visa. |
| Micronesia | Visa not required | 30 days | |
| Moldova | eVisa | | Visa not required if holding a valid visa /residence permit that is issued by a European Union member state or Schengen Area, Canada, Ireland, UK, US |
| Monaco | Visa required | | |
| Mongolia | eVisa | 30 days | |
| Montenegro | Visa required | | Visa not required for holders of a valid Australia, Japan, Canada, New Zealand, Ireland, US, UK or a Schengen Visa.; Holders of residence permit in the United Arab Emirates may enter, in Montenegro for a duration of 10 days |
| Morocco | Visa required | | May apply for an e-Visa if holding a valid visa or a residency document issued by one of the following countries: Schengen Area, Australia, Canada, Ireland, New Zealand, United Kingdom, United States a residency document issued by Cyprus, Japan, United Arab Emirates. |
| Mozambique | Visa not required | 3 months | |
| Myanmar | Visa required | | |
| Nauru | Visa required | | |
| Nepal | Online Visa / Visa on arrival | 90 days | |
| Netherlands | Visa required | | |
| New Zealand | Visa required | | Holders of an Australian Permanent Resident Visa or Resident Return Visa may be granted a New Zealand Resident Visa on arrival permitting indefinite stay (pursuant to the Trans-Tasman Travel Arrangement), subject to meeting character requirements and obtaining an Electronic Travel Authority prior to departure. |
| Nicaragua | Visa required | | |
| Niger | Visa required | | |
| Nigeria | eVisa | 90 days | |
| North Macedonia | Visa required | | |
| Norway | Visa required | | |
| Oman | Visa required | | Holders of a GCC state resident permit can get a 28 days visa on arrival that costs 5 Omani Riyals. |
| Pakistan | Online Visa | 3 months | Online Visa eligible. |
| Palau | Free visa on arrival | 30 days | |
| Panama | Visa not required | 90 days | Visa is not required for holders of a multiple-entry visa valid for at least 6 months at the time of entry or permanent residency issued by Australia, Canada, European Union, Japan, Singapore, South Korea, US, UK. |
| Papua New Guinea | eVisa | 30 days | May apply for an e-visa under the type of "Tourist - Own Itinerary". |
| Paraguay | Visa required | | |
| Peru | Visa required | | |
| Philippines | Visa not required | 30 days | |
| Poland | Visa required | | |
| Portugal | Visa required | | |
| Qatar | eVisa | | |
| Romania | Visa required | | |
| Russia | Visa not required | 90 days | 90 days within any 180 day period. |
| Rwanda | Visa not required | 30 days | |
| Saint Kitts and Nevis | eVisa | | |
| Saint Lucia | Visa not required | 6 weeks | |
| Saint Vincent and the Grenadines | Visa not required | 3 months | |
| Samoa | Visa not required | 60 days | |
| San Marino | Visa required | | |
| São Tomé and Príncipe | eVisa | | |
| Saudi Arabia | Visa required | | Tourist visa on arrival and eVisa for holders of a valid multiple entry visa from US, UK or Schengen area, under the condition that the multiple entry visa has been used at least once, proving that by showing the entry and exit stamps of the country of issuance.; Eligible for an e-Visa or transit visa if holding a valid residence permit of no less than 3 months in a GCC country. |
| Senegal | Visa on arrival | 90 days | |
| Serbia | Visa required | | |
| Seychelles | Electronic Border System | 3 months | Application can be submitted up to 30 days before travel.; Visitors must upload a reservation confirmation(s) for each visitor's location of stay in Seychelles.; Yellow fever vaccination certificate is required if coming from endemic countries.; Payment of the fee (EUR 10) by credit or debit card.; Valid for one journey only and it expires once exit the country. |
| Sierra Leone | eVisa / Visa on arrival | 3 months / 30 days | |
| Singapore | Visa not required | 30 days | |
| Slovakia | Visa required | | |
| Slovenia | Visa required | | |
| Solomon Islands | Visa required | | |
| Somalia | eVisa | 30 days | |
| South Africa | Visa not required | 90 days | |
| South Sudan | eVisa | | Obtainable online.; Printed visa authorization must be presented at the time of travel. |
| Spain | Visa required | | |
| Sri Lanka | ETA / Visa on arrival | 60 days / 30 days | |
| Sudan | Visa required | | |
| Suriname | Visa not required | 90 days | An entrance fee of USD 50 or EUR 50 must be paid online prior to arrival.; Multiple entry e-Visa is also available. |
| Sweden | Visa required | | |
| Switzerland | Visa required | | |
| Syria | eVisa | | |
| Tajikistan | eVisa | | |
| Tanzania | Visa not required | 90 days | |
| Thailand | eVisa / Visa on arrival | 15 days | |
| Timor-Leste | Visa on arrival | 30 days | |
| Togo | eVisa | 15 days | |
| Tonga | Visa required | | |
| Trinidad and Tobago | Visa not required | | |
| Tunisia | Visa not required | 90 days | |
| Turkey | eVisa | | Ordinary passport holders can obtain e-Visa as of May 5, 2025 via the website. |
| Turkmenistan | Visa required | | |
| Tuvalu | Visa on arrival | 1 month | |
| Uganda | eVisa | 3 months | |
| Ukraine | Visa required | | |
| United Arab Emirates | Visa required | | May apply using 'Smart service'. |
| United Kingdom and Crown dependencies | Visa required | | Visa required since 19 July 2023. |
| United States | Visa required | | |
| Uruguay | Visa required | | |
| Uzbekistan | Visa required | | |
| Vanuatu | Visa not required | 30 days | |
| Vatican City | Visa required | | |
| Venezuela | eVisa | | Introduction of Electronic Visa System for Tourist and Business Travelers. |
| Vietnam | eVisa | | e-Visa is valid for 90 days and multiple entry. |
| Yemen | Visa required | | Yemen introduced an e-Visa system for visitors who meet certain eligibility requirements (group travel of 10 or more people, business trips, and transit etc.). |
| Zambia | Visa not required | 90 days | |
| Zimbabwe | Visa not required | 3 months | |

=== Dependent, disputed, or restricted territories ===
Unrecognized or partially recognized countries

| Territory | Conditions of access | Notes |
|---|---|---|
| Abkhazia | Visa required | |
| Kosovo | Visa not required | 90 days |
| Northern Cyprus | Visa not required | |
| Palestine | Visa not required | Arrival by sea to Gaza Strip not allowed. |
| Sahrawi Arab Democratic Republic | | Undefined visa regime in the Western Sahara controlled territory. |
| Somaliland | Visa on arrival | 30 days for 30 US dollars, payable on arrival. |
| South Ossetia | Visa not required | Multiple entry visa to Russia and 3 day prior notification are required to enter South Ossetia. |
| Taiwan | Visa required | |
| Transnistria | Visa not required | |

Dependent and autonomous territories

| Territory | Conditions of access | Notes |
China
| Hong Kong | Visa not required | 90 days |
| Macau | Visa not required | 30 days |
Denmark
| Faroe Islands | Visa required | |
| Greenland | Visa required | |
France
| French Guiana | Visa required | |
| French Polynesia | Visa required | |
| (France) French West Indies | Visa required | Includes overseas departments of Guadeloupe and Martinique and overseas collectivities of Saint Barthélemy and Saint Martin. |
| Mayotte | Visa required | |
| New Caledonia | Visa required | |
| Réunion | Visa required | |
| Saint Pierre and Miquelon | Visa required | |
| Wallis and Futuna | Visa required | |
Netherlands
| Aruba | Visa required | |
| Caribbean Netherlands | Visa required | Includes Bonaire, Sint Eustatius and Saba. |
| Curaçao | Visa required | |
| Sint Maarten | Visa required | |
New Zealand
| Cook Islands | Visa not required | 31 days |
| Niue | Visa not required | 30 days |
| Tokelau | Visa required | |
United Kingdom
| Akrotiri and Dhekelia | Visa required | |
| Anguilla | Visa not required | Holders of a valid visa issued by the United Kingdom do not require a visa. |
| Bermuda | Visa not required | |
| British Indian Ocean Territory | Special permit required | Special permit required. |
| British Virgin Islands | Visa not required | |
| Cayman Islands | Visa not required | |
| Falkland Islands | Visa required | |
| Gibraltar | Visa not required | |
| Montserrat | Visa not required | |
| Pitcairn Islands | Visa not required | 14 days visa free and landing fee 35 USD or tax of 5 USD if not going ashore. |
| Ascension Island | eVisa | 3 months within any year period. |
| Saint Helena | Visitor's Pass required | Visitor's Pass granted on arrival valid for 4/10/21/60/90 days for 12/14/16/20/25 pound sterling. |
| Tristan da Cunha | Permission required | Permission to land required for 15/30 pounds sterling (yacht/ship passenger) for Tristan da Cunha Island or 20 pounds sterling for Gough Island, Inaccessible Island or Nightingale Islands. |
| South Georgia and the South Sandwich Islands | Permit required | Pre-arrival permit from the Commissioner required (72 hours / 1 month for 110 / 160 pounds sterling). |
| Turks and Caicos Islands | Visa required | Holders of a valid visa issued by Canada, United Kingdom or United States do not required a visa for a maximum stay of 90 days. |
United States
| American Samoa | Visa required | |
| Guam | Visa required | |
| Northern Mariana Islands | Visa required | |
| Puerto Rico | Visa required | |
| U.S. Virgin Islands | Visa required | |
Antarctica and adjacent islands
Special permits required for Bouvet Island, British Antarctic Territory, French Southern and Antarctic Lands, Argentine Antarctica, (Australia) Australian Antarctic Territory, (Antártica Chilena Province) Chilean Antarctic Territory, (Australia) Heard Island and McDonald Islands, (Norway) Peter I Island, (Norway) Queen Maud Land, (New Zealand) Ross Dependency.

== See also ==
- Visa policy of Namibia
- Namibian passport
