= Visa policy of Madagascar =

Policy on permits required to enter Madagascar

Citizens of any countries and territories (except Palestine) may obtain a visa on arrival or e-Visa to Madagascar.

== Visa policy map ==
Visa policy of Madagascar Madagascar Visa on arrival / eVisa Admission refused

== Visa on arrival ==
For a stay up to 90 days, a visa on arrival is sufficient, which is issued upon arrival at Ivato International Airport in Antananarivo and all other airports with international connections (such as Antsiranana, Toamasina, Tuléar).

After the cost of a 15-day visa on arrival had remained at 10 EUR or 10 USD for many years, the price increased in 2026—initially to 25 EUR and later to 30 EUR.

== Electronic visa (e-Visa) ==
Madagascar reactivated the e-Visa system around April 2023.

The price of the eVisa — valid until January 2026 — can be found below.

Duration of stay	MGA	USD	EUR	INR
15 days	44,125	10	10	817
30 days	115,000	37	35	2,200
60 days	135,000	45	40	2,580
90 days	175,000	55	50	3,350

In February 2026, there was a significant price increase, particularly for the 15-day stay.

== Palestine ==
Entry and transit is refused for citizens of Palestine, even if not leaving the aircraft and proceeding by the same flight.

== Visitor statistics ==
Most non-resident visitors arriving to Madagascar were from the following countries of nationality:

Country	2017
France	60,144
Mauritius	3,732
China	3,083
Comoros	2,757
United Kingdom	2,700
Italy	2,691
United States	2,621
South Africa	2,576
Germany	2,570
Switzerland	1,786

== See also ==
- Visa requirements for Malagasy citizens
