= Malagasy passport =

Passport issued to citizens of Madagascar

Malagasy Passport
- The front cover of a Malagasy passport
- Type: Passport
- Issued by: Madagascar
- First issued: 1961
- Purpose: Identification
- Eligibility: Malagasy citizenship
- Expiration: 5 years
- Cost: 190,000 Ariary
- Website: https://passeport.pn.gov.mg

The Malagasy passport is issued to citizens of Madagascar for international travel.

As of 1 January 2017, Malagasy citizens had visa-free or visa on arrival access to 50 countries and territories, ranking the Malagasy passport 86th in terms of travel freedom (tied with Gabonese and Haitian passports) according to the Henley visa restrictions index.

== Gallery ==
Cover since 2013

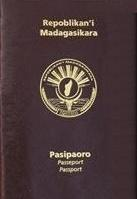
Cover from 2000 to 2013

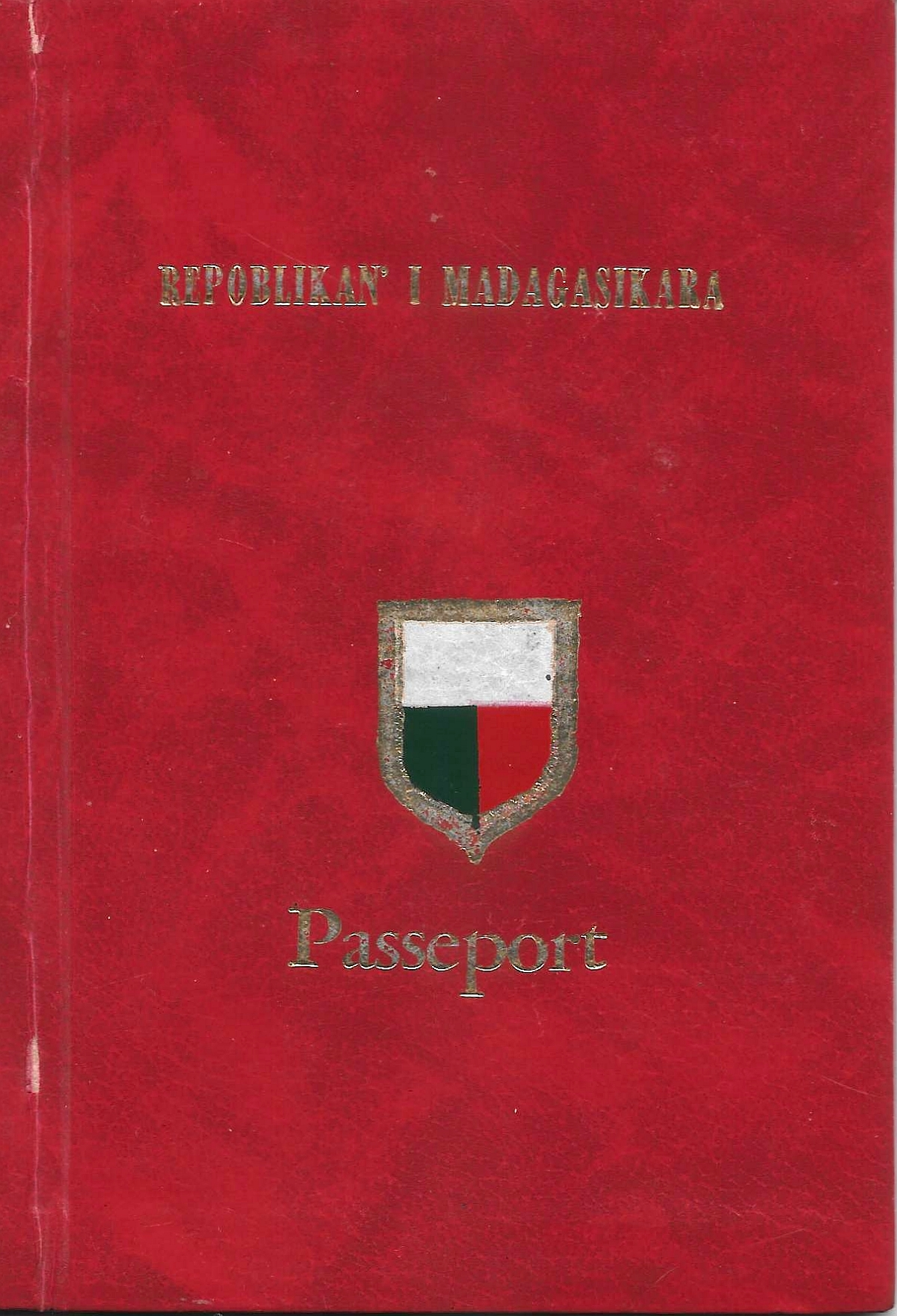
Cover from 1993 to 2000

== See also ==
- Visa requirements for Malagasy citizens
- List of passports
