= Minimum wage in Germany =

German history of minimum wage legislation

Mindestlohngesetz (Minimum Wage Act)
- Long title: Gesetz zur Regelung eines allgemeinen Mindestlohns (Act Regulating a General Minimum Wage)
- Territorial extent: Germany
- Enacted: 11 August 2014
- Commenced: 16 August 2014
- Effective: 1 January 2015
- Introduced by: Third Merkel cabinet
- Status: Amended

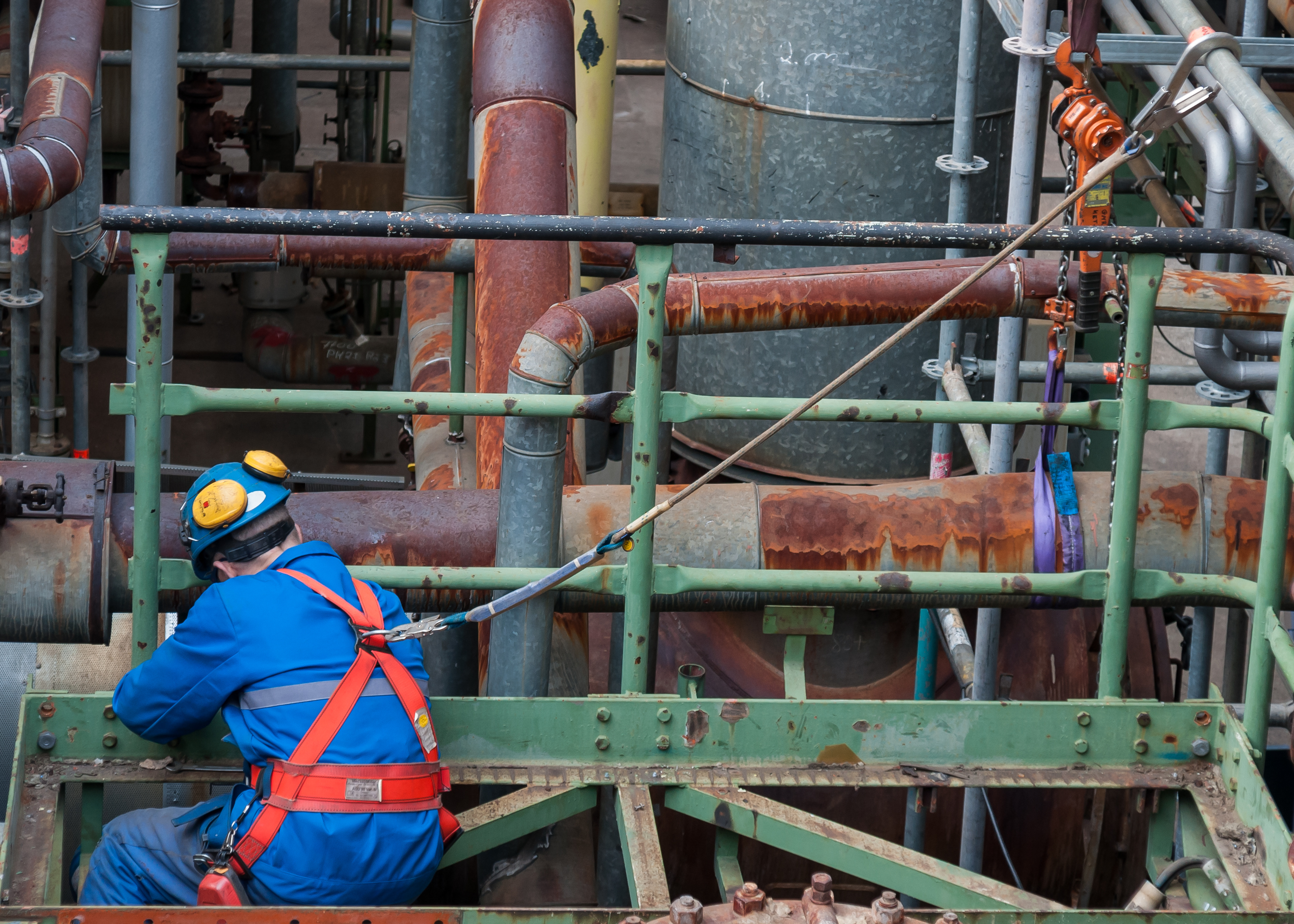
Industrial worker in Cologne, Germany

Minimum wage in Germany is €13.90 per hour, pre-tax since 1 January 2026. The legislation (German: Gesetz zur Regelung eines allgemeinen Mindestlohns) was introduced on 1 January 2015, by Angela Merkel's third government, a coalition between the SPD and the CDU. The implementation of a minimum wage was the SPD's main request during the coalition's negotiations as its central electoral promise during the 2013 federal election campaign. Previously, Germany had minimum wages only in specific sectors, negotiated by trade unions, and some were below the minimum wage level introduced in 2015.

The initial minimum wage was €8.50 per hour, pre-tax. Since then, Germany's Minimum Wage Commission (Mindestlohnkommission) regularly proposes adjustments to the minimum wage level. It was last increased to 12 euros per hour pre-tax in October 2022.

Due to inflation, in December 2022 this wage was worth as much as €9.80 were worth in January 2015. A €12 wage implies a gross nominal monthly salary of €2,080 for a full-time employee, meaning someone working forty hours per week. The increase to €12 was decided on 3 June 2022 by the Bundestag (400 to 41, with 200 abstentions).

There remain exceptions to the wage minimum for workers on a traineeship, employees during their vocational training, volunteers, internships up to three months, young people and the long-term unemployed.

== Minimum Wage Commission ==
In order to adjust the amount of the minimum wage, the German government instituted a permanent commission, with nine members: a president, three workers’ representatives, three employers’ representatives and two economists that do not have voting rights within the commission. It assesses Germany's overall economic performance to find a suitable minimum wage level. The first minimum wage adjustment was made in June 2016, and was followed two years later by another adjustment, in June 2018, that raised the minimum wage to €9.19.

== Debate around the minimum wage in Germany ==
The minimum wage was one of the most controversial topics during the 2013 legislative election campaign. The social democratic party SPD, the German green party and the left-wing party Die Linke, were in favour of a general minimum wage. By contrast, the economically liberal FDP, and the socially conservative CDU, remained sceptical.

The economic research institution CESifo Group Munich advocated against the introduction of a minimum wage of €8.50. According to a study of the Center for Economic Studies of the Ifo Institute in 2014, the minimum wage was predicted to cost up to 900,000 jobs, especially in the eastern part of Germany. However, a study from the London School of Economics and Political Science contradicted it by demonstrating that the minimum wage did not actually lead to job losses. Indeed, the Economic Policy Research Discussion Paper, which analysed employment levels in Germany across different regions from 2011 to 2016, showed that the unemployment rate decreased in regions with previously lower wage levels. Besides, a study of the German Institute for Economic Research showed that the minimum wage increased the hourly wage, but not the total income of people who work in the low-wage sector. Since hourly wages increased slightly, working hours decreased simultaneously to offset higher costs.

The October 2022 minimum wage increase to 12 euros per hour, was estimated to increase the pay of over 6 million people according to Labour Minister Hubertus Heil, and should not reduce the number of jobs, a prime concern of critics.

=== Applicability to driving through Germany ===
The European Commission criticised that Germany made foreign shipping companies pay minimum wages to their lorry drivers while they drive through Germany. The Commission introduced an infringement procedure against Germany on 19 May 2015, arguing that the minimum wage had a disproportionately restrictive impact on the transport sector, impeding freedom to provide services and the free movement of goods. Freedom to provide services and free movement of goods are two of the four principal freedoms on which the European Union is based. The Commission issued a supplementary letter on this subject to the German authorities on 16 June 2016, initiating two months' notice of potential legal action.

Relatedly, the Financial Court of Berlin-Brandenburg ruled in 2019 that foreign lorry drivers must receive minimum wages when driving through Germany.

== Current and past rates ==
The below graph and table display how the German minimum wage level has developed over time since its introduction. To be precise, they show the pre-tax (German Brutto) hourly minimum wage. The last column of the table, in 2015 euros, shows that in real terms, the minimum wage level has increased less than in nominal terms. In other words, when Germany raised the minimum wage, the increases were partly eaten up by increases in the cost of living (inflation).

Germany's minimum wage rate since its introduction. Real values are in 2015 euros. View chart definition.

From	Minimum wage	Relative change	In January 2015 euros, in the From month	In January 2015 euros, in the last month
1 January 2027	€14.60	+5.04%		
1 January 2026	€13.90	+8.42%		
1 January 2025	€12.82	+3.3%		
1 January 2024	€12.41	+3.4%	€9.82	
1 October 2022	€12.00	+14.8%	€9.67	€9.52
1 July 2022	€10.45	+6.4%	€8.69	€8.50
1 January 2022	€9.82	+2.3%	€8.68	€8.24
1 July 2021	€9.60	+1.1%	€8.59	€8.51
1 January 2021	€9.50	+1.6%	€8.80	€8.58
1 January 2020	€9.35	+1.7%	€8.75	€8.73
1 January 2019	€9.19	+3.9%	€8.75	€8.56
1 January 2018	€8.84	-	€8.54	€8.36
1 January 2017	€8.84	+4.0%	€8.66	€8.49
1 January 2016	€8.50	-	€8.46	€8.27
1 January 2015	€8.50	(introduced)	€8.50	€8.40

== Compliance ==
An estimated 0.5 to 2.4 million workers were illegally paid below the minimum wage in Germany in 2018. Around 10% of university students working jobs eligible for minimum wage were also being paid less, illegally, a few months after the introduction of the minimum wage.
