= International Civil Aviation Organization Public Key Directory =

Aviation e-passport database

The International Civil Aviation Organization Public Key Directory (ICAO PKD) is a database maintained by the International Civil Aviation Organization holding national cryptographic keys related to the authentication of e-passport information.

The ICAO PKD content is open to the public, and can be downloaded for free at https://download.pkd.icao.int/.

== Participants ==
The United Nations became the first non-state participant in October 2012, enabling issuing of e-UNLP, the electronic form of the United Nations laissez-passer.

In December 2014, ICAO reported the PKD as having 45 participants.

In 2015 the German Bundesdruckerei (German Federal Printing Office) won the request for tender of the ICAO to provide the ICAO PKD.

In July 2017, ICAO reported the PKD as having 58 participants.

As of November 2017, 60 participants were part of the ICAO PKD, with the European Union being the 60th member and at the same time the second non-state participant.

As of April 2025, 104 participants were part of the ICAO PKD.

== Participation Fees ==
Each ICAO PKD participant needs to pay a one-time registration fee and annual fees. The registration fee was USD 56,000 at first, and was reduced to USD 15,900 since March 2015. The annual fee comprises two components: the ICAO portion and the PKD Operator portion. Every participant pays the same amount of annual fees.

PKD Fee Schedules
Year	Number of participants	Annual fee per participant (in USD)	Ref
2025	100	20795.00	
2024	88	22680.46	
2023	82	23745.45	
2022	80	25096.25	
2021	71	26282	
2020	63	28515.71	
2019	62	29853.23	
2018	60	31755.00	
2017	54	34352	
2016	45	39162	
2015	45	43642	
2014	39	45005	
2013	35	58059	

== See also ==
- Passenger name record
- Passport
  - Biometric passport
  - Machine-readable passport
- Public-key cryptography
