= Visa policy of Namibia =

Policy on permits required to enter Namibia

The Government of Namibia allows citizens of specific countries and territories to travel to Namibia for tourism, visiting friends and relatives as well as official purposes for 3 months with ordinary, diplomatic and service passports without having to obtain a visa. All visitors must have a passport valid for at least 6 months.

Namibia announced the start of issuing African passport holders with visas on arrival at ports of entry as a first step towards the eventual abolition of all visa requirements for all Africans.

Namibia is expected to become part of the universal KAZA visa.

== Visa policy map ==
Visa policy of Namibia Namibia Visa not required (3 months) Visa on arrival / eVisa eVisa

== Visa exemption ==
Holders of ordinary passports issued by the following jurisdictions can enter Namibia without a visa for a maximum stay of 3 months within any 1 calendar year:

- Angola
- Botswana^{ID}
- Brazil
- Cuba
- Eswatini
- Hong Kong
- Indonesia
- Jamaica
- Kenya
- Lesotho
- Macao^{1}
- Malawi
- Malaysia
- Mauritius
- Mozambique
- Russia
- Seychelles
- Singapore
- South Africa
- Tanzania
- Zambia
- Zimbabwe

_{ID - May enter Namibia using an ID card in lieu of a passport.}
_{1 - including holders of MSAR passports and MSAR Travel Permits.}

Date of visa changes
- 1 June 1991: Finland
- 23 July 2018: Jamaica
- 30 August 2018: Indonesia

Cancelled

- 1 April 2025: Armenia, Australia, Austria, Azerbaijan, Belarus, Belgium, Canada, Denmark, Finland, France, Germany, Iceland, Ireland, Italy, Japan, Kazakhstan, Kyrgyzstan, Liechtenstein, Luxembourg, Moldova, Netherlands, New Zealand, Norway, Portugal, Spain, Sweden, Switzerland, Tajikistan, Turkmenistan, Ukraine, Uzbekistan, United Kingdom, United States

=== Non-ordinary passports ===
Holders of diplomatic or official service category passports of the following countries may enter without a visa.

- Algeria
- Benin
- Burkina Faso
- Burundi
- Cameroon
- Cape Verde
- Central African Republic
- Chad
- Comoros
- Congo
- DR Congo
- Côte d'Ivoire
- Djibouti
- Egypt
- Equatorial Guinea
- Eritrea
- Ethiopia
- France
- Gabon
- Gambia
- Germany
- Ghana
- Guinea
- Guinea-Bissau
- India
- Liberia
- Madagascar
- Mali (30 days)
- Mauritania
- Niger
- Nigeria
- Poland
- Rwanda
- São Tomé and Príncipe
- Senegal
- Sierra Leone
- Togo
- Tunisia
- Turkey
- Uganda
- Venezuela
- Vietnam
- Western Sahara

Namibia signed an agreement with Botswana in February 2023 allowing citizens to travel between the two countries using only identity cards, with passports no longer being needed.

== Visa on arrival ==
Citizens of the following countries and territories can obtain a visa on arrival for a maximum stay of 90 days. The cost of the visa on arrival is N$1,600 (approximately €82 / US$88) for citizens of non-African countries and N$1,200 (approximately €62 / US$66) for nationals of African countries.

- All European Union member states
- Andorra
- Antigua and Barbuda
- Argentina
- Armenia
- Australia
- Azerbaijan
- Bahamas
- Barbados
- Belarus
- Benin
- Bolivia
- Brunei
- Burkina Faso
- Burundi
- Cambodia
- Cameroon
- Canada
- Cape Verde
- Central African Republic
- Chad
- Chile
- Comoros
- Côte d'Ivoire
- Djibouti
- Dominican Republic
- Ecuador
- Equatorial Guinea
- Eritrea
- Gabon
- Gambia
- Georgia
- Grenada
- Guinea
- Guinea-Bissau
- Haiti
- Iceland
- Israel
- Japan
- Kazakhstan
- Kiribati
- Kyrgyzstan
- Liberia
- Liechtenstein
- Madagascar
- Maldives
- Mauritania
- Mexico
- Moldova
- Monaco
- Mongolia
- Montenegro
- New Zealand
- Nicaragua
- Niger
- North Macedonia
- Norway
- Panama
- Paraguay
- Peru
- Rwanda
- Samoa
- São Tomé and Príncipe
- Serbia
- Sierra Leone
- South Korea
- St. Kitts and Nevis
- St. Lucia
- St. Vincent and the Grenadines
- Suriname
- Sweden
- Switzerland
- Tajikistan
- Thailand
- Togo
- Tonga
- Trinidad and Tobago
- Tunisia
- Turkey
- Turkmenistan
- Uganda
- Ukraine
- United Arab Emirates
- United Kingdom^{1}
- United States
- Uruguay
- Uzbekistan
- Vanuatu
- Vatican City
- Venezuela
- Vietnam
- Western Sahara

_{1 - including all classes of British nationality.}

Travelers can obtain a visa upon arrival in the following locations.

- Windhoek Hosea Kutako International Airport
- Walvis Bay Airport
- Port of Lüderitz
- Port of Walvis Bay
- Ariamsvlei Border Post (with South Africa)
- Impalia Island Border Post
- Oranjemund Border Post (with South Africa)
- Oshikango Border Post (with Angola)
- Katima Mulilo Border Post (with Zambia)
- Mohembo Border Post (with Botswana)
- Ngoma Border Post (with Botswana)
- Noordoewer Border Post (with South Africa)
- Trans-Kalahari Border Post (with Botswana)

== Electronic visa (e-Visa) ==
Nationals eligible for a visa on arrival are also eligible for a simplified e-visa. The Namibian authorities strongly recommend applying for an e-Visa in advance to avoid any complications or delays upon arrival in the country.

Holders of passports from countries that are neither visa-exempt nor eligible for a visa on arrival can obtain a separate eVisa that requires more documents and has a longer processing time.

Holders of an e-Visa may enter Namibia through one of the following points of entry:

- Windhoek Hosea Kutako International Airport
- Walvis Bay Airport
- Eros Airport
- Ondangwa Airport
- Oranjemund Airport
- Gobabis Airport
- Grootfontein Airport
- Keetmanshoop Airport
- Lüderitz Airport
- Mpacha Airport
- Rundu Airport
- Singalamwe Airport
- Lüderitz Port
- Walvis Bay Port
- Ariamsvlei Border Post (with South Africa)
- Impalia Island Border Post
- Omahenene Border Post (with Angola)
- Oranjemund Border Post (with South Africa)
- Oshikango Border Post (with Angola)
- Kasika Border Post (with Zambia)
- Katima Mulilo Border Post (with Zambia)
- Border Post Katwitwi Border Post (with Angola)
- Klein Manasse Border Post (with South Africa)
- Mata-Mata Border Post (with Botswana)
- Mohembo Border Post (with Botswana)
- Ngoma Border Post (with Botswana)
- Nkurenkuru Border Post (with Angola)
- Noordoewer Border Post (with South Africa)
- Rucana Border Post (with Angola)
- Sarasungu Border Post (with Angola)
- Sendelingsdrift Border Post (with South Africa)
- Trans-Kalahari Border Post (with Botswana)
- Velloorsdrift Border Post (with South Africa)

== History ==
Before 2025, nationals of 33 countries which include some EU states (Austria, Belgium, Denmark, Finland, France, Germany, Ireland, Italy, Luxembourg, Netherlands, Portugal, Spain, Sweden), other European countries (Iceland, Liechtenstein, Norway, Switzerland, Armenia, Azerbaijan, Belarus, Ukraine, Moldova, the United Kingdom), as well Australia, New Zealand, the United States, and Canada, could enter Namibia visa-free. Effective 1 April 2025, the Namibia government abolished visa-free entry for the nationals of these countries citing the lack of reciprocal agreements. The affected citizens are still eligible to obtain Namibian visitor visas online without visiting a Namibian diplomatic office.

== Visitor statistics ==
Most visitors arriving in Namibia and spending at least 1 night in recent years were from the following countries of nationality:

Country	2023	2022	2017	2016	2015	2014
South Africa	349,728	116,897	325,968	342,044	351,864	312,153
Angola	112,336	82,199	403,129	398,939	447,038	470,747
Germany	79,989	62,691	123,022	122,142	90,729	86,121
Zambia	56,243	25,041	195,289	190,457	147,754	125,889
Botswana	56,157	19,761	52,021	50,665	45,049	36,724
Zimbabwe	30,460		89,241	83,287	70,940	61,187
United States	25,526	12,419	31,144	27,264	24,430	21,425
United Kingdom	18,426	12,705	33,450	31,558	25,412	25,653
France	16,002	17,503	31,758	23,484	20,189	19,577
Netherlands	14,822	9,075		20,169	13,967	11,137
Total	863,872	461,027	1,499,442	1,469,258	1,387,773	1,320,062

== See also ==
- Visa requirements for Namibian citizens
