= Reisepass =

Reisepass is the German word for passport. It may refer to:

- Austrian passport
- Belgian passport
- East German passport
- German passport
- Liechtenstein passport
- Luxembourg passport
- Swiss passport
