= Namenserklärung =

A Namenserklärung (literally "name declaration") is an administrative process under German law that must be fulfilled by German citizens in certain circumstances upon birth and marriage, and may optionally be performed upon divorce and widowhood. In some cases, a person will have no name under German law, and will not be able to obtain a German passport or identity card, until a name declaration has been performed.

== When a name declaration is required ==
=== Birth ===
A name declaration is required for children in the circumstances below. Even if the child is indisputably a German citizen, the following cannot be issued with a German passport or identity card until a name declaration has been lodged:

- A child whose parents are married but do not share a married name.
- A child whose parents were unmarried at the time of the child's birth, if the parents wish for the child to have a surname other than the mother's surname (children born out of wedlock in Germany are by default given their mother's surname – if the parents opt to keep this, a name declaration is not required).
- A child with a surname combining both parents' surnames. Such a surname is not permitted under German law unless a parent has another citizenship, in which case the child may be given a double-barrelled surname if this is permitted by the parent's other country of citizenship.

A name registration may also be required for an adult whose parents were married at the time of their birth but did not share a married name. This issue can arise if the child was born abroad and has another citizenship alongside German, and has always used their foreign identity documents and has thus never needed German ones. Such a person wishing to obtain a German passport or identity card will be unable to do so until they perform a name declaration.

=== Marriage ===
Spouses who get married in Germany can declare their desired surname to the registrar during the administrative formalities at the wedding. This is deemed equivalent to a name declaration and appears on the marriage certificate, and no further action is required. Thus, spouses who choose to change their name through marriage can acquire new German identity documents without needing to make a name declaration.

German citizens who get married abroad and choose (or are required by foreign law) to change their name, must perform a name declaration. German law does not automatically recognise the married name of a citizen married abroad: until a name declaration is made, their surname under German law remains the surname they held prior to the marriage, regardless of whether other jurisdictions recognise the married name immediately.

Furthermore, German citizens who get married abroad are limited in their choice of married name: if they change their surname, they may only take either spouse's birth surname or surname held at the time of the marriage. An exception is made for German spouses who also hold another nationality: they may take any other surname format permitted under the law of their other country of citizenship.

=== Divorce; death of spouse ===
Under German law, a person's surname does not change automatically upon divorce or if their spouse dies. Divorcees and widow(er)s may choose to revert to their maiden name or any other surname that they have held in their life. Those wishing to do so must file a name declaration.
