= Visa requirements for Luxembourgish citizens =

Administrative entry restrictions

Visa requirements for Luxembourgish citizens (also referred to as Luxembourgers) are administrative entry restrictions by the authorities of other states placed on citizens of Luxembourg.

As of 2026, Luxembourgish citizens had visa-free or visa on arrival access to 185 countries and territories, ranking the Luxembourg passport 4th in the world according to the Henley Passport Index.

== Visa requirements map ==
Visa requirements for Luxembourgish citizens holding ordinary passports Luxembourg Freedom of movement Visa not required / ESTA / eTA / eVisitor Visa on arrival eVisa Visa available both on arrival or online Visa required

== Visa requirements ==
Country	Visa requirement	Allowed stay	Notes (excluding departure fees)
Afghanistan	eVisa	30 days	Visa is not required in case born in Afghanistan or can proof that one of their parents is a national of Afghanistan or born in Afghanistan.; e-Visa : Visitors must arrive at Kabul International (KBL).
Albania	Visa not required	90 days	ID card valid
Algeria	Visa required		
Andorra	Visa not required		ID card valid
Angola	Visa not required	30 days	30 days per trip, but no more than 90 days within any 1 calendar year for tourism purposes only.; Visitors must have a return/onward ticket and a hotel reservation confirmation.; An International Certificate of Vaccination is required.
Antigua and Barbuda	Visa not required	6 months	
Argentina	Visa not required	90 days	
Armenia	Visa not required	180 days	
Australia	eVisitor	90 days	90 days on each visit in 12-month period if granted.
Austria	Visa not required	Freedom of movement; ID card valid	
Azerbaijan	eVisa	30 days	
Bahamas	Visa not required	8 months	
Bahrain	eVisa / Visa on arrival	14 days	
Bangladesh	Visa on arrival	30 days	
Barbados	Visa not required	6 months	
Belarus	Visa not required	30 days	Visa-free until 31 December 2024.
Belgium	Visa not required	Freedom of movement; ID card valid	
Belize	Visa not required	1 month	
Benin	eVisa	30 days	Must have an international vaccination certificate.
Bhutan	eVisa		Pre-approved visa can be picked up on arrival.
Bolivia	Visa not required	90 days	
Bosnia and Herzegovina	Visa not required	90 days	90 days within any 180 day period.; ID card valid
Botswana	Visa not required	90 days	
Brazil	Visa not required	90 days	90 days within any 180 day period.
Brunei	Visa not required	90 days	
Bulgaria	Visa not required	Freedom of movement; ID card valid	
Burkina Faso	eVisa / Visa on arrival	1 month	
Burundi	Visa on arrival	1 month	
Cambodia	eVisa / Visa on arrival	30 days	Visa is also obtainable online.
Cameroon	eVisa		Pre-approved visa can be picked up on arrival.
Canada	eTA / Visa not required	6 months	eTA required if arriving by air.
Cape Verde	Visa not required	30 days	Must register online at least five days prior to arrival.
Central African Republic	Visa required		
Chad	Visa required		
Chile	Visa not required	90 days	
China	Visa not required	30 days	Visa-free from 14 March 2024 to 31 December 2026.; 30-day visa-free for flight crew members.; 240-hour (10-day) visa-free transit to a third country or region (including Hong Kong, Macau or Taiwan) using any mode of transport. Must have a confirmed onward ticket/itinerary, and enter through 1 of 64 approved ports.; During which, may freely travel within the 24 provinces permitted for visa-free transit and engage in tourism, business, and visits.; 24-hour visa-free transit to a third country or region (including Hong Kong, Macau, and Taiwan), is available at most international airports, without leaving the airport.; Travellers who need to leave the airport may obtain a temporary entry permit from immigration.; 5-day port visa (Visa on Arrival) for Shenzhen if arriving at designated ports of entry from Hong Kong by land or sea, for stays within Shenzhen.; 3-day port visa (Visa on Arrival) if arriving in Zhuhai or Xiamen at designated ports of entry, for stays within the respective city.; 15-day visa-free entry for cruise ship passengers in tour groups, if arriving at any cruise port along China's coastline, including but not limited to Tianjin; Dalian; Shanghai; Lianyungang; Wenzhou; Zhoushan; Xiamen; Qingdao; Guangzhou; Shenzhen; Beihai; Haikou; Sanya. May further travel inland to all regions of coastal provinces (and equivalents) and Beijing.; May apply for a port visa (Visa on Arrival) if travelling for an urgent, qualified reason. Prior clearance for port visa is highly recommended or may be denied boarding by airlines.
Colombia	Visa not required	90 days	90 days - extendable up to 180-days stay within a one-year period.
Comoros	Visa on arrival	45 days	
Republic of the Congo	Visa required		
Democratic Republic of the Congo	eVisa	7 days	
Costa Rica	Visa not required	90 days	
Côte d'Ivoire	eVisa	3 months	e-Visa holders must arrive via Port Bouet Airport.
Croatia	Visa not required	Freedom of movement; ID card valid	
Cuba	eVisa	90 days	Can be extended up to 90 days with a fee.
Cyprus	Visa not required	Freedom of movement; ID card valid	
Czech Republic	Visa not required	Freedom of movement; ID card valid	
Denmark	Visa not required	Freedom of movement (DK); ID card valid	
Djibouti	eVisa	90 days	
Dominica	Visa not required	90 days	90 days within any 180 day period.
Dominican Republic	Visa not required	90 days	
Ecuador	Visa not required	90 days	
Egypt	eVisa / Visa on arrival	30 days	
El Salvador	Visa not required	3 months	
Equatorial Guinea	eVisa		
Eritrea	Visa required		Pre-approved visa can be picked up on arrival.
Estonia	Visa not required	Freedom of movement; ID card valid	
Eswatini	Visa not required	30 days	
Ethiopia	eVisa / Visa on arrival	up to 90 days	Visa on arrival is obtainable only at Addis Ababa Bole International Airport.; e-Visa holders must arrive via Addis Ababa Bole International Airport.; e-Visa is available for 30 or 90 days.
Fiji	Visa not required	4 months	
Finland	Visa not required	Freedom of movement; ID card valid	
France	Visa not required	Freedom of movement (in Regions of France); ID card valid	
Gabon	eVisa	90 days	e-Visa holders must arrive via Libreville International Airport.
Gambia	Visa not required	90 days	
Georgia	Visa not required	1 year	
Germany	Visa not required	Freedom of movement; ID card valid	
Ghana	Visa required		Pre-approved visa can be picked up on arrival.
Greece	Visa not required	Freedom of movement; ID card valid	
Grenada	Visa not required	3 months	
Guatemala	Visa not required	90 days	
Guinea	eVisa	90 days	
Guinea-Bissau	Visa on arrival	90 days	
Guyana	Visa not required	3 months	
Haiti	Visa not required	90 days	
Honduras	Visa not required	3 months	
Hungary	Visa not required	Freedom of movement; ID card valid	
Iceland	Visa not required	Freedom of movement; ID card valid	
India	eVisa	30 days	e-Visa holders must arrive via 32 designated airports (Note: Ahmedabad; Amritsar; Bagdogra; Bengaluru; Bhubaneswar; Chandigarh; Chennai; Coimbatore; Delhi; Gaya; Goa-Dabolim; Goa-Manohar; Guwahati; Hyderabad; Indore; Jaipur; Kannur; Kochi; Kolkata; Kozhikode; Lucknow; Madurai; Mangaluru; Mumbai; Nagpur; Port Blair; Pune; Surat; Thiruvananthapuram; Tiruchirappalli; Varanasi; Visakhapatnam) or 5 designated seaports. (Note: Chennai; Cochin; Mormugao (Goa); Mumbai; Mangalore); An Indian e-Tourist Visa may only be obtained twice within 1 calendar year.; Foreigners of Pakistani origin or who hold a Pakistani Passport are not eligible for an e-Visa. Foreigners who are not Pakistani nationals, but whose parents or grandparents (either paternal or maternal) were born in, or were permanent residents in Pakistan, are also not eligible for an e-Visa.
Indonesia	e-VOA / Visa on arrival	30 days	Not available at all entry points.
Iran	eVisa	30 days	Passengers who have already made an application, at least two days before arrival, at the Iranian Ministry of Foreign Affair's e-Visa website. And present the submission notification at the airport's visa desk may obtain a visa on arrival.
Iraq	eVisa / Visa on arrival	60 days	
Ireland	Visa not required	Freedom of movement; ID card valid	
Israel	Electronic Travel Authorization	3 months	
Italy	Visa not required	Freedom of movement; ID card valid	
Jamaica	Visa not required	90 days	
Japan	Visa not required	90 days	
Jordan	eVisa / Visa on arrival		Visa can be obtained upon arrival, it will cost a total of 40 JOD, obtainable at most international ports of entry and land border crossings (except King Hussein/Allenby Bridge)
Kazakhstan	Visa not required	30 days	
Kenya	Electronic Travel Authorisation	90 days	Applications can be submitted up to 90 days prior to travel and must be submitted at least 3 days in advance.; eTA fee is 32.50 USD.; Proof of reservation at the hotel where visitors plan to stay is required (if staying with friends, an invitation letter is also acceptable).; Yellow fever vaccination certificate is required if coming from endemic countries.
Kiribati	Visa not required	90 days	90 days within any 180 day period.
North Korea	Visa required		
South Korea	Electronic Travel Authorization	90 days	The validity period of a K-ETA is 3 years from the date of approval.
Kuwait	eVisa / Visa on arrival	3 months	
Kyrgyzstan	Visa not required	60 days	
Laos	Visa not required	15 days	
Latvia	Visa not required	Freedom of movement.; ID card valid.	
Lebanon	Free visa on arrival	1 month	Extendable for 2 additional months; Granted free of charge at Beirut International Airport or any other port of entry if there is no Israeli visa or seal, holding a telephone number, an address in Lebanon, and a non refundable return or circle trip ticket.
Lesotho	Visa not required	14 days	
Liberia	e-VOA		Travelers can pre-apply for the visa online through a dedicated portal allows them to obtain a Visa upon arrival in Liberia if there is no embassy in their home country. But if there is a Liberian embassy in your country, you are required to apply for your visa directly at the embassy and not through this portal.; Currently available only upon arrival at Roberts International Airport (ROB) in Monrovia.; Pre-approved visa can be picked up on arrival.
Libya	eVisa		
Liechtenstein	Visa not required	Freedom of movement.; ID card valid.	
Lithuania	Visa not required	Freedom of movement.; ID card valid.	
Madagascar	eVisa / Visa on arrival	60 days	
Malawi	eVisa / Visa on arrival	90 days	
Malaysia	Visa not required	3 months	
Maldives	Free visa on arrival	30 days	
Mali	Visa required		
Malta	Visa not required	Freedom of movement; ID card valid	
Marshall Islands	Visa not required	90 days	90 days within any 180 day period.
Mauritania	eVisa		Available at Nouakchott–Oumtounsy International Airport.
Mauritius	Visa not required	90 days	
Mexico	Visa not required	180 days	
Micronesia	Visa not required	90 days	90 days within any 180 day period.
Moldova	Visa not required	90 days	90 days within any 180 day period.; ID card valid
Monaco	Visa not required		ID card valid
Mongolia	Visa not required	30 days	The Ministry of Foreign Affairs of Mongolia has exempted visas for 34 countries from January 2023 to December 2026.
Montenegro	Visa not required	90 days	ID card valid for 30 days.
Morocco	Visa not required	90 days	
Mozambique	eVisa / Visa on arrival	30 days	
Myanmar	eVisa / Visa on arrival	28 days	e-Visa holders must arrive via Yangon, Nay Pyi Taw or Mandalay airports or via land border crossings with Thailand — Tachileik, Myawaddy and Kawthaung or India — Rih Khaw Dar and Tamu.; e-Visa available for both tourism (allowed stay is 28 days) or business (allowed stay is 70 days) purposes.; Visa on arrival may be obtainted at Yangon International Airport, Nay Pyi Taw International Airport or Mandalay International Airport.
Namibia	Visa not required	3 months	3 months within a calendar day.
Nauru	Visa required		
Nepal	Online Visa / Visa on arrival	90 days	
Netherlands	Visa not required	Freedom of movement (European Netherlands); ID card valid	
New Zealand	Electronic Travel Authority	3 months	International Visitor Conservation and Tourism Levy must be paid upon requesting an Electronic Travel Authority.; Holders of an Australian Permanent Resident Visa or Resident Return Visa may be granted a New Zealand Resident Visa on arrival permitting indefinite stay (pursuant to the Trans-Tasman Travel Arrangement), subject to meeting character requirements and obtaining an Electronic Travel Authority prior to departure. Such travellers are not required to pay the International Visitor Conservation and Tourism Levy.
Nicaragua	Visa not required	90 days	
Niger	Visa required		
Nigeria	eVisa	90 days	Pre-approved visa can be picked up on arrival.
North Macedonia	Visa not required	90 days	90 days within any 180 day period. ID card valid
Norway	Visa not required	Freedom of movement; ID card valid	
Oman	Visa not required / eVisa	14 days / 30 days	
Pakistan	eVisa	90 days	
Palau	Visa not required	90 days	90 days within any 180 day period.
Panama	Visa not required	90 days	
Papua New Guinea	eVisa	60 days	Available at Gurney Airport (Alotau), Mount Hagen Airport, Port Moresby Airport and Tokua Airport (Rabaul).
Paraguay	Visa not required	90 days	
Peru	Visa not required	90 days	90 days within any 6-month period.
Philippines	Visa not required	30 days	
Poland	Visa not required	Freedom of movement; ID card valid	
Portugal	Visa not required	Freedom of movement; ID card valid	
Qatar	Visa not required	90 days	
Romania	Visa not required	Freedom of movement; ID card valid	
Russia	eVisa	30 days	
Rwanda	Visa not required	30 days	
Saint Kitts and Nevis	Electronic Travel Authorisation	3 months	
Saint Lucia	Visa not required	90 days	90 days within any 180 day period.
Saint Vincent and the Grenadines	Visa not required	90 days	90 days within any 180 day period.
Samoa	Free Entry Permit on arrival	90 days	90 days within any 180 day period.
San Marino	Visa not required		ID card valid
São Tomé and Príncipe	Visa not required	15 days	
Saudi Arabia	eVisa / Visa on arrival	90 days	
Senegal	Visa not required	90 days	
Serbia	Visa not required	90 days	90 days within any 180 day period.; ID card valid
Seychelles	Visa not required	3 months	
Sierra Leone	eVisa / Visa on arrival	3 months / 30 days	
Singapore	Visa not required	90 days	
Slovakia	Visa not required	Freedom of movement; ID card valid	
Slovenia	Visa not required	Freedom of movement; ID card valid	
Solomon Islands	Visa not required	90 days	90 days within any 180 day period.
Somalia	eVisa		Available at Berbera, Borama, Burao, Erigavo and Hargeisa airports.; 30 days, available at Bosaso Airport, Galcaio Airport and Mogadishu Airport.
South Africa	Visa not required	90 days	
South Sudan	eVisa		Obtainable online.; Printed visa authorization must be presented at the time of travel.
Spain	Visa not required	Freedom of movement; ID card valid	
Sri Lanka	eVisa / Visa on arrival	60 days / 30 days	Sri Lanka introduced an ETA valid for 30 days.
Sudan	Visa required		
Suriname	Visa required	90 days	An entrance fee of USD 50 or EUR 50 must be paid online prior to arrival.; Multiple entry e-Visa is also available.
Sweden	Visa not required	Freedom of movement; ID card valid	
Switzerland	Visa not required	Freedom of movement; ID card valid	
Syria	eVisa		
Tajikistan	Visa not required	30 days	At Dushanbe International Airport.; Visa also available online.; e-Visa holders can enter through all border points.
Tanzania	eVisa / Visa on arrival	3 months	
Thailand	Visa not required	60 days	Maximum two visits annually if not arriving by air.
Timor-Leste	Visa not required	90 days	90 days within any 180 day period.
Togo	eVisa	15 days	
Tonga	Visa not required	90 days	90 days within any 180 day period.
Trinidad and Tobago	Visa not required	90 days	90 days within any 180 day period.
Tunisia	Visa not required	90 days	
Turkey	Visa not required	3 months	ID card valid.
Turkmenistan	Visa required		Pre-approved visa can be picked up on arrival.
Tuvalu	Visa not required	90 days	90 days within any 180 day period.
Uganda	eVisa	3 months	Determined at the port of entry.
Ukraine	Visa not required	90 days	90 days within any 180 day period.
United Arab Emirates	Visa not required	90 days	90 days within any 180 day period.
United Kingdom	Electronic Travel Authorisation	6 months	ID card valid until 1 October 2021.
United States	Visa Waiver Program	90 days	ESTA is valid for 2 years from the date of issuance.; ESTA is also required when entering the country by cruise ship or land.; A Form I-94 is required for entry into the United States by land. It carries a $30 fee and can be obtained either online or upon arrival.; Visa required for nationals of VWP countries who have travelled or been present in Iran, Iraq, Libya, North Korea, Somalia, Sudan, Syria or Yemen at any time on or after 1 March 2011 or Cuba at any time on or after 12 January 2021, or nationals of VWP countries who are also nationals of Iran, Iraq, North Korea, Sudan or Syria. Exceptions apply if the travel was in military or diplomatic service of the VWP country.
Uruguay	Visa not required	90 days	
Uzbekistan	Visa not required	30 days	
Vanuatu	Visa not required	90 days	90 days within any 180 day period.
Vatican City	Visa not required		
Venezuela	Visa not required	90 days	
Vietnam	eVisa		e-Visa is valid for 90 days and multiple entry.
Yemen	Visa required		
Zambia	Visa not required	30 days	Also eligible for a universal visa allowing access to Zimbabwe.
Zimbabwe	eVisa / Visa on arrival	30 days	Also eligible for a universal visa allowing access to Zambia.

== Territories and disputed areas ==
Visa requirements for Luxembourgish citizens for visits to various territories, disputed areas, partially recognized countries and restricted zones:

Europe

- Abkhazia — Visa required.
- Mount Athos — Special permit required (4 days: 25 euro for Orthodox visitors, 35 euro for non-Orthodox visitors, 18 euro for students). There is a visitors' quota: maximum 100 Orthodox and 10 non-Orthodox per day and women are not allowed.
- (Belarus) Brest and Grodno — Visa not required for 10 days.
- Northern Cyprus — Visa free access for 3 months. ID card valid.
- (United Nations) UN Buffer Zone in Cyprus — Access Permit is required for travelling inside the zone, except Civil Use Areas.
- Faroe Islands — Visa not required. ID card valid.
- Gibraltar — Visa not required.
- Guernsey – Visa not required.
- (Guernsey) Alderney – Visa not required.
- (Guernsey) Sark – Visa not required.
- Isle of Man — Visa not required.
- (Norway) Jan Mayen — permit issued by the local police required for staying for less than 24 hours and permit issued by the Norwegian police for staying for more than 24 hours.
- Jersey – Visa not required.
- Kosovo — visa free for 90 days. ID card valid.
- Closed cities and regions in Russia — special authorization required.
- South Ossetia — Visa free. Multiple entry visa to Russia and three-day prior notification are required to enter South Ossetia.
- Transnistria — Visa free. Registration required after 24h. ID card valid.

Africa

- Eritrea (outside Asmara) — visa covers Asmara only; to travel in the rest of the country, a Travel Permit for Foreigners is required (20 Eritrean nakfa).
- Sahrawi Arab Democratic Republic (Western Sahara controlled territory) — Visa not required up to 3 months.
- Somaliland — Visa issued on arrival (30 days for 30 US dollars, payable on arrival).
- Sudan — All foreigners traveling more than 25 kilometers outside of Khartoum must obtain a travel permit.
- (Sudan) Darfur — Separate travel permit is required.

Asia

- Hong Kong — Visa not required for 90 days.
- India — Protected Area Permit (PAP) required for whole states of Nagaland and Sikkim and parts of states Manipur, Arunachal Pradesh, Uttaranchal, Jammu and Kashmir, Rajasthan, Himachal Pradesh. Restricted Area Permit (RAP) required for all of Andaman and Nicobar Islands and parts of Sikkim. Some of these requirements are occasionally lifted for a year.
- Iraqi Kurdistan — You can apply for an e-Visa (30 days) to visit the Iraqi Kurdistan Region.
- Kazakhstan — Special permission required for the town of Baikonur and surrounding areas in Kyzylorda Oblast, and the town of Gvardeyskiy near Almaty.
- (Iran) Kish Island — Visitors to Kish Island do not require a visa.
- Macao — Visa not required for 90 days.
- (Malaysia) Sabah and Sarawak — These states have their own immigration authorities and passport is required to travel to them, however the same visa applies.
- Maldives — With the exception of the capital Malé, tourists are generally prohibited from visiting non-resort islands without the express permission of the Government of Maldives.
- North Korea outside Pyongyang – People are not allowed to leave the capital city, tourists can only leave the capital with a governmental tourist guide (no independent moving)
- Palestine — Visa not required. Arrival by sea to Gaza Strip not allowed.
- Taiwan — Visa not required for 90 days.
- (Tajikistan) Gorno-Badakhshan Autonomous Province — OIVR permit required (15+5 Tajikistani Somoni) and another special permit (free of charge) is required for Lake Sarez.
- Turkmenistan — A special permit, issued prior to arrival by Ministry of Foreign Affairs, is required if visiting the following places: Atamurat, Cheleken, Dashoguz, Serakhs and Serhetabat.
- (China) Tibet Autonomous Region — Tibet Travel Permit required (10 US Dollars).
- (United Nations) Korean Demilitarized Zone — restricted zone.
- (United Nations) UNDOF Zone and Ghajar — restricted zones.
- (Vietnam) Phú Quốc — can visit without a visa for up to 30 days.
- Yemen — Special permission needed for travel outside Sanaa or Aden.

Caribbean and North Atlantic

- Anguilla — Visa not required for 3 months.
- Aruba — Visa not required for 30 days.
- (Netherlands) Bonaire, St. Eustatius and Saba — Visa not required for 3 months.
- Bermuda — Visa not required for 21 days (extendable).
- British Virgin Islands — Visa not required for 1 month (extendable).
- Cayman Islands — Visa not required for 6 months.
- Colombia — Visitors arriving at San Andrés and Leticia must buy tourist cards on arrival.
- Curacao — Visa not required for 3 months.
- Montserrat — Visa not required for 6 months.
- Greenland — Visa not required.
- (Venezuela) Margarita Island — All visitors are fingerprinted.
- Puerto Rico — Visa not required under the Visa Waiver Program, for 90 days on arrival from overseas for 2 years. ESTA required.
- Saint Pierre and Miquelon — Visa not required.
- Sint Maarten — Visa not required for 3 months.
- Turks and Caicos Islands — Visa not required for 90 days.
- U.S. Virgin Islands — Visa not required under the Visa Waiver Program, for 90 days on arrival from overseas for 2 years. ESTA required.

Oceania

- American Samoa — Electronic authorization for 30 days.
- (Australia) Ashmore and Cartier Islands — special authorisation required.
- (France) Clipperton Island — special permit required.
- Cook Islands — Visa free access for 31 days.
- (Fiji) Lau Province — Special permission required.
- French Polynesia — Visa not required.
- Guam — Visa not required under the Visa Waiver Program, for 90 days on arrival from overseas for 2 years. ESTA required.
- New Caledonia — Visa not required for 3 months.
- Niue — Visa on arrival valid for 30 days is issued free of charge.
- Northern Mariana Islands — Visa not required.
- Pitcairn Islands — 14 days visa free and landing fee US$35 or tax of US$5 if not going ashore.
- Tuvalu Entry permit required.
- United States Minor Outlying Islands — special permits required for Baker Island, Howland Island, Jarvis Island, Johnston Atoll, Kingman Reef, Midway Atoll, Palmyra Atoll and Wake Island.
- Wallis and Futuna — Visa not required.

South Atlantic and Antarctica

- Falkland Islands — Visitor Permit valid for 4 weeks is issued on arrival.
- Saint Helena, Ascension and Tristan da Cunha
  - Ascension Island — eVisa for 3 months within any year period.
  - Saint Helena — Entry Permit (£25) for 183 days is issued on arrival.
  - Tristan da Cunha — Permission to land required for 15/30 pounds sterling (yacht/ship passenger) for Tristan da Cunha Island or 20 pounds sterling for Gough Island, Inaccessible Island or Nightingale Islands.
- South Georgia and the South Sandwich Islands — Pre-arrival permit from the Commissioner required (72 hours/1 month for 110/160 pounds sterling).
- Antarctica and adjacent islands — special permits required for French Southern and Antarctic Lands, Argentine Antarctica, (Australia) Australian Antarctic Territory, (Antártica Chilena Province) Chilean Antarctic Territory, (Australia) Heard Island and McDonald Islands, (Norway) Peter I Island, (Norway) Queen Maud Land, (New Zealand) Ross Dependency.
- Arab League — Certain countries will deny access to holders of Israeli visas or passport stamps of Israel because of the Arab League boycott of Israel.

== Non-ordinary passports ==
Holders of diplomatic Luxembourg passports have additional visa-free access to Pakistan and Russia. Holders of diplomatic or service passports of any country have visa-free access to Cape Verde, Ethiopia, Mali and Zimbabwe.

== Right to consular protection in non-EU countries ==
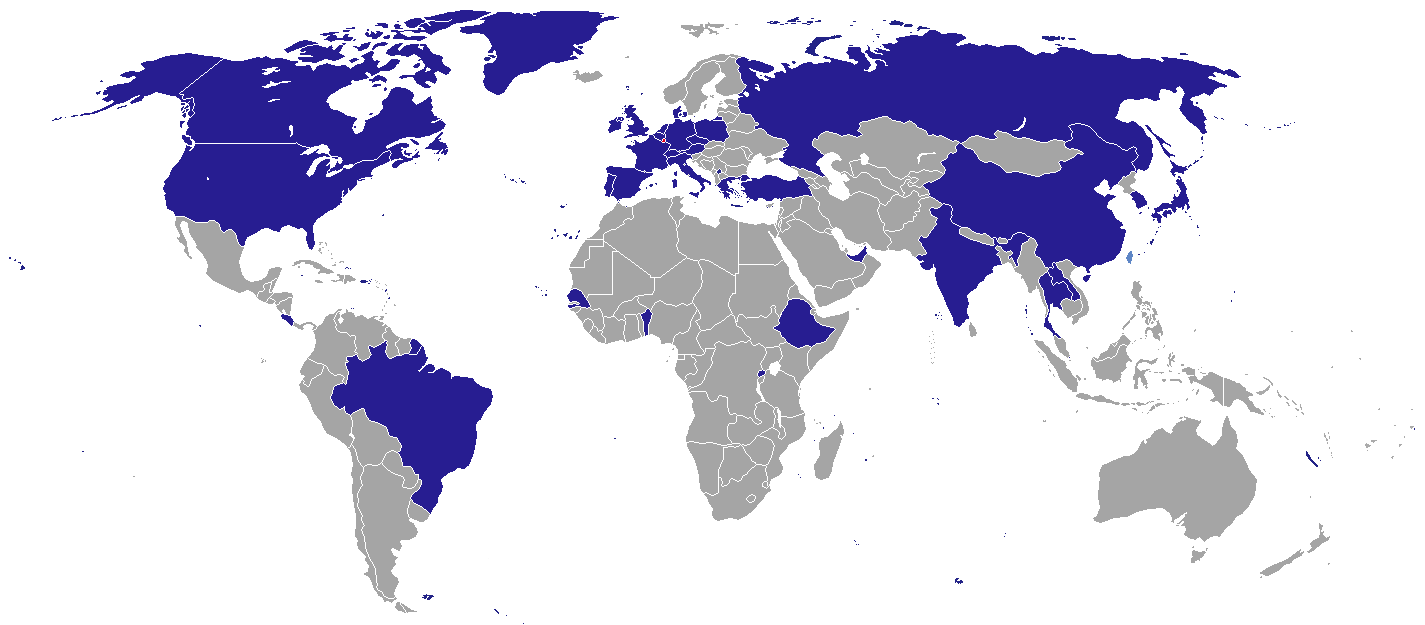
Countries with Luxembourg diplomatic missions

When in a non-EU country where there is no Luxembourg embassy, Luxembourg citizens as EU citizens have the right to get consular protection from the embassy of any other EU country present in that country. Upon request, the authorities of the largely unrecognized Republic of Artsakh may attach their visa and / or stamps to a separate piece of paper in order to avoid detection of travel to their country.

See also List of diplomatic missions of Luxembourg.

== Non-visa restrictions ==
=== Blank passport pages ===
Many countries require a minimum number of blank pages to be available in the passport being presented, typically one or two pages. Endorsement pages, which often appear after the visa pages, are not counted as being valid or available.

=== Vaccination ===
Cover of the new International Certificate of Vaccination issued by the Bureau of Quarantine in the Philippines since 2021

The African countries of Angola, Benin, Burkina Faso, Burundi, Cameroon, Central African Republic, Democratic Republic of the Congo, Republic of the Congo, Côte d'Ivoire, Gabon, Ghana, Guinea-Bissau, Mali, Niger, Sierra Leone and Togo, South Sudan and Uganda, along with French Guiana in South America, require all incoming passengers older than nine months to one year, to have a current International Certificate of Vaccination or Prophylaxis.

Some other countries require vaccination only if the passenger is coming from an infected area or has visited one recently or has transited for 12 hours in those countries: Algeria, Botswana, Cabo Verde, Chad, Djibouti, Egypt, Eswatini, Ethiopia, Gambia, Ghana, Guinea, Lesotho, Libya, Equatorial Guinea, Eritrea, Madagascar, Malawi, Mauritania, Mauritius, Mozambique, Namibia, Nigeria, Papua New Guinea, Seychelles, Somalia, South Africa, Sudan, Tunisia, Uganda, Tanzania, Zambia and Zimbabwe.

=== Passport validity length ===
Very few countries, such as Paraguay, just require a valid passport on arrival.

However many countries and groupings now require only an identity card – especially from their neighbours. Other countries may have special bilateral arrangements that depart from the generality of their passport validity length policies to shorten the period of passport validity required for each other's citizens or even accept passports that have already expired (but not been cancelled).

Some countries, such as Japan, Ireland and the United Kingdom, require a passport valid throughout the period of the intended stay.

In the absence of specific bilateral agreements, countries requiring passports to be valid for at least 6 more months on arrival include Afghanistan, Algeria, Anguilla, Bahrain, Bhutan, Botswana, British Virgin Islands, Brunei, Cambodia, Cameroon, Cape Verde, Cayman Islands, Central African Republic, Chad, Comoros, Costa Rica, Côte d'Ivoire, Curaçao, Ecuador, Egypt, El Salvador, Equatorial Guinea, Fiji, Gabon, Guinea Bissau, Guyana, Haiti, India, Indonesia, Iran, Iraq, Israel, Jordan, Kenya, Kiribati, Kuwait, Laos, Madagascar, Malaysia, Marshall Islands, Mongolia, Myanmar, Namibia, Nepal, Nicaragua, Nigeria, Oman, Palau, Papua New Guinea, Peru, Philippines, Qatar, Rwanda, Samoa, Saudi Arabia, Singapore, Solomon Islands, Somalia, Sri Lanka, Sudan, Suriname, Tanzania, Thailand, Timor-Leste, Tokelau, Tonga, Turkey, Tuvalu, Uganda, United Arab Emirates, Vanuatu, Venezuela, and Vietnam.

Countries requiring passports valid for at least 4 months on arrival include Micronesia and Zambia.

Countries requiring passports with a validity of at least 3 months beyond the date of intended departure include Azerbaijan, Bosnia and Herzegovina, Honduras, Montenegro, Nauru, Moldova and New Zealand. Similarly, the EEA countries of Iceland, Liechtenstein, Norway, all European Union countries (except Ireland) together with Switzerland also require 3 months validity beyond the date of the bearer's intended departure unless the bearer is an EEA or Swiss national.

Countries requiring passports valid for at least 3 months on arrival include Albania, North Macedonia, Panama, and Senegal.

Bermuda requires passports to be valid for at least 45 days upon entry.

Countries that require a passport validity of at least one month beyond the date of intended departure include Eritrea, Hong Kong, Lebanon, Macau, the Maldives and South Africa.

==== Maximum passport age ====
Countries of the Schengen area require non-EU passports to be less than 10 years old upon entry.

=== Criminal record ===
Some countries, including Australia, Canada, Fiji, New Zealand and the United States, routinely deny entry to non-citizens who have a criminal record, while others impose restrictions depending on the type of conviction and the length of the sentence.

=== Persona non grata ===
The government of a country can declare a diplomat persona non grata, banning them from entering the country or expelling them if they have already entered. In non-diplomatic use, the authorities of a country may also declare a foreigner persona non grata permanently or temporarily, usually because of unlawful activity.

=== Israeli stamps ===
Kuwait, Lebanon, Libya, and Yemen do not allow entry to people with passport stamps from Israel or whose passports have either a used or an unused Israeli visa, or where there is evidence of previous travel to Israel such as entry or exit stamps from neighbouring border posts in transit countries such as Jordan and Egypt.

To circumvent this Arab League boycott of Israel, the Israeli immigration services have now mostly ceased to stamp foreign nationals' passports on either entry to or exit from Israel (unless the entry is for some work-related purposes). Since 15 January 2013, Israel no longer stamps foreign passports at Ben Gurion Airport. Passports are still (as of 22 June 2017) stamped at Erez when passing into and out of Gaza.

Iran refuses admission to holders of passports containing an Israeli visa or stamp that is less than 12 months old.

=== Biometrics ===
Several countries mandate that all travellers, or all foreign travellers, be fingerprinted on arrival and will refuse admission to or even arrest travellers who refuse to comply. In some countries, such as the United States, this may apply even to transit passengers who merely wish to change planes rather than go landside.

Fingerprinting countries/regions include Afghanistan, Argentina, Brunei, Cambodia, China, Ethiopia, Ghana, Guinea, India, Japan, Kenya (both fingerprints and a photo are taken), Malaysia upon entry and departure, Mongolia, Saudi Arabia, the Schengen Area, Singapore, South Korea, Taiwan, Thailand, Uganda, the United Arab Emirates and the United States.

Many countries also require a photo be taken of people entering the country. The United States, which does not fully implement exit control formalities at its land frontiers (although long mandated by its own legislation), intends to implement facial recognition for passengers departing from international airports to identify people who overstay their visa.

Together with fingerprint and face recognition, iris scanning is one of three biometric identification technologies internationally standardised since 2006 by the International Civil Aviation Organization (ICAO) for use in e-passports and the United Arab Emirates conducts iris scanning on visitors who need to apply for a visa. The United States Department of Homeland Security has announced plans to greatly increase the biometric data it collects at US borders. In 2018, Singapore began trials of iris scanning at three land and maritime immigration checkpoints.

== See also ==
- Visa requirements for the European Union citizens
- Luxembourgian passport
