= Luxembourgish passport =

Passport

Luxembourgish passport; Passeport luxembourgeois Lëtzebuergesche Pass Luxemburgischer Reisepass
- Front cover of the current Luxembourg passport (with chip), issued since February 2015
- Type: Passport
- Issued by: Passpost, Visas and Legalisation Office of Duchy of Luxembourg
- First issued: 28 August 2006 (biometric passport); 11 May 2026(current version)
- Purpose: Identification
- Eligibility: Luxembourgish citizenship
- Expiration: [Current] 10 years (aged 18 or over) / 5 years (aged 4 to 18) / 2 years (aged under 4); [Previous] 5 years (aged 18 or over) / 5 years (aged 4 to 18) / 2 years (aged under 4)
- Cost: 10-year passports : €50 (standard procedure) / €150 (fast-track procedure); 5-year passports : €50 (standard procedure) / €150 (fast-track procedure); 2-year passports : €30 (standard procedure) / €90 (fast-track procedure)

A Luxembourgish passport (French: passeport luxembourgeois; Luxembourgish: lëtzebuergesche Pass; German: luxemburgischer Reisepass) is an international travel document issued to nationals of the Grand Duchy of Luxembourg, and may also serve as proof of Luxembourgish citizenship. Besides enabling the bearer to travel internationally and serving as indication of Luxembourgish citizenship, the passport facilitates the process of securing assistance from Luxembourg consular officials abroad or other European Union member states in case a Luxembourg consular is absent, if needed.

Luxembourg has introduced a new biometric passport on 11 May 2026. New passports are valid for 10 years for aged 18 and over, 5 years for minors aged 4 to 18, and for 2 years for minors aged under four.

According to the 2026 Henley Passport Index, citizens of Luxembourg can visit 185 countries without a visa or with a visa granted on arrival. Additionally, the World Tourism Organization also published a report on 15 January 2016 ranking the Luxembourgish passport 1st in the world (tied with British, Danish, Finnish, German, Italian and Singaporean passports) in terms of travel freedom, with a mobility index of 160 (out of 215 with no visa weighted by 1, visa on arrival weighted by 0.7, eVisa by 0.5 and traditional visa weighted by 0).

Every citizen of Luxembourg is a citizen of the European Union (EU). As such (s)he can live and work in any member state of the EU as a result of the right of freedom of movement granted in Article 21 of the Treaty on the Functioning of the European Union.

A citizen of Luxembourg is also a citizen of a member state of the European Economic Area (EEA). The Citizens' Rights Directive defines the right of free movement for citizens of the EEA, which includes the three EFTA members Iceland, Norway and Liechtenstein plus the member states of the EU. Switzerland, which is a member of EFTA but not of the EEA, has a separate multilateral agreement on free movement with the EU and its member states. As a result, the Luxembourgish passport, along with the identity card, allows for freedom of movement in any of the states of the EU / EEA / EFTA / Switzerland.

== See also ==
- Visa requirements for citizens of Luxembourg
- Passports of the European Union
- Luxembourg identity card
