= Luxembourg identity card =

National identity card of Luxembourg

Luxembourg Identity Card
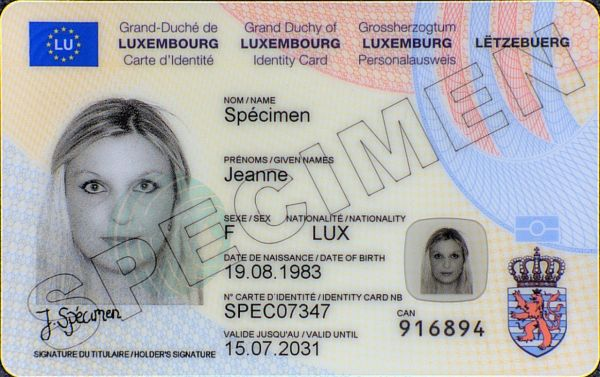
- Front of the card

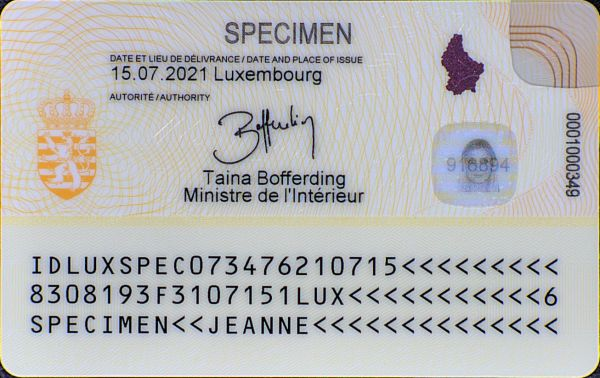
- Back of the card
- Type: National identity card
- Issued by: Luxembourg
- First issued: 01 July 2014
- Valid in: EFTA; European Union; United Kingdom (EU Settlement Scheme); Rest of Europe (except Belarus, Russia, and Ukraine) Georgia; Montserrat (max. 14 days); Overseas France; Turkey
- Expiration: 10 years (age 15 or over); 5 years (age 4–14); 2 years (age 0–4)

The Luxembourg identity card is issued to Luxembourg citizens. It serves as proof of identity and nationality and can also be used for travel within the European Union and a number of other European countries.

== Eligibility ==
All Luxembourg citizens who are habitually resident in Luxembourg and aged 15 or over are required to apply for a Luxembourg identity card, whilst it is optional for those under 15. Luxembourg identity cards issued to those aged 15 or over are valid for 10 years.

== Application ==
To obtain a Luxembourg identity card, the applicant has to visit the local administrative office.

== See also ==
- Luxembourgish passport
- National identity cards in the European Union
