= Luxembourg nationality law =

Law of 8 March 2017 on Luxembourg nationality Loi du 8 mars 2017 sur la nationalité luxembourgeoise

Chamber of Deputies
- Long title: Loi du 8 mars 2017 sur la nationalité luxembourgeoise et portant abrogation de: 1. la loi du 23 octobre 2008 sur la nationalité luxembourgeoise; 2. la loi du 7 juin 1989 relative à la transposition des noms et prénoms des personnes qui acquièrent ou recouvrent la nationalité luxembourgeoise
- Citation: Loi du 8 mars 2017
- Territorial extent: Luxembourg
- Signed by: Grand Duke of Luxembourg
- Signed: 8 March 2017
- Commenced: 1 April 2017
- Status: Amended

Luxembourg nationality law is ruled by the Constitution of Luxembourg. The Grand Duchy of Luxembourg is a member state of the European Union and, therefore, its citizens are also EU citizens.

== Nationality by birth ==
Luxembourg law generally follows jus sanguinis with limited jus soli provisions. Citizenship is automatically given to:

- a child of a Luxembourg citizen parent, regardless of the place of birth;
- a child born in Luxembourg to a parent born in Luxembourg (even if the parent is not a Luxembourg citizen); or
- a child born in Luxembourg to parents who are stateless or unable to pass their nationality onto their child; or
- a child born in Luxembourg to unknown parents.
- Furthermore, a child born in Luxembourg to foreign parents, neither of whom were born in Luxembourg, gains Luxembourg citizenship automatically upon turning 18 years old if:
1. at least one of their parents lived continuously in Luxembourg in the 12 months preceding their birth; and
2. they have lived continuously in Luxembourg in the 5 years immediately preceding their 18th birthday.

== Naturalization ==
Acquisition of citizenship by naturalization is permitted, subject to the following conditions:

- being at least eighteen years old;
- five total years of legal residence in the Grand Duchy, including an uninterrupted period of one year immediately before applying for citizenship;
- passing a Luxembourgish language exam;
- taking a course on "living together in the Grand Duchy" or passing the associated examination; and
- never having been given a custodial sentence of 12 months or more or a suspended custodial sentence of 24 months or more, in Luxembourg or any other country, for an action that would constitute a crime under Luxembourgish law, provided that the sentence was not fully served within the fifteen years before the application for naturalization

== Acquisition of nationality by option ==
Luxembourg law also provides for the possibility to acquire nationality by option, which is a separate legal concept from naturalization.

Obtaining nationality by option is permitted in the following ten cases:

1. Adults with a parent (biological or adopted) or grandparent who is/was a Luxembourger and was unable to pass Luxembourg nationality to the person at birth (e.g. due to the nationality laws of another country forbidding it);
2. Parents of Luxembourg minors (requires 5 years of residency, including the 12 months prior to the option declaration, and passing both the Luxembourgish language exam and the civics course or exam);
3. Persons who are married to a Luxembourg citizen (requires passing both the Luxembourgish language exam and the civics course or exam; no minimum residency or marriage length requirement for spouses living in Luxembourg; 3 years of marriage required for spouses living outside Luxembourg);
4. Persons aged 12 or above who were born in Luxembourg and did not automatically become a citizen at birth due to neither of their parents being Luxembourg citizens or born in Luxembourg (requires 5 years of continuous residency and for at least one parent to have lived continuously in Luxembourg for at least 12 months immediately prior to the person's birth);
5. Adults who have completed at least 7 years' schooling in Luxembourg (requires 12 months continuous residency immediately prior to the citizenship application);
6. Adults who have legally resided in Luxembourg for at least 20 years (requires 12 months continuous residency immediately prior to the citizenship application and a total of 24 hours of attendance at a Luxembourgish language course, but no requirement to pass the language exam);
7. Adults who have fulfilled the obligations of the Welcome and Integration Contract (Contrat d'accueil et d'intégration) or the introductory modules of the Citizens' Pact for Intercultural Living (Biergerpakt), a free, optional course available to any foreigner living in Luxembourg (requires 5 years residency, including 12 months continuous residency immediately before the application, and passing both the Luxembourgish language exam and the civics course or exam);
8. Adults who settled in Luxembourg before turning 18 (requires 5 years residency, including 12 months continuous residency before applying, and passing both the Luxembourgish language exam and the civics course or exam);
9. Adults who are stateless, refugees or have subsidiary protection status (requires 5 years residency, including 12 months of continuous residency, and passing both the Luxembourgish language exam and the civics course or exam); or
10. Volunteer soldiers who have completed one year of good and loyal service, as certified by the Luxembourg Army's Chief of Staff.

All of the options also have the same "good repute" requirements as for naturalization, i.e. the applicant must not have made any false statements in conjunction with the request for citizenship or have been issued an immediate custodial sentence of 12 months or more or a suspended custodial sentence of 24 months or more, in any country, if that sentence was not fully served within the fifteen years before the application for acquiring citizenship.

Option declarations are taken before the administration of the commune of residence or, if the applicant is not resident in Luxembourg, the administration of Luxembourg City. If the Minister of Justice does not object to and cancel the option declaration, Luxembourg nationality is acquired four months after the declaration is received by the Minister of Justice; minor children of an adult granted nationality by option are also included on the option declaration and receive nationality when their parent does.

== Recovery of citizenship ==
It is also possible to "recover" or "reclaim" Luxembourg nationality if a person can prove that they have an ancestor who was a Luxembourg citizen as of 1 January 1900. The Luxembourgish diaspora at the time moved to France, Belgium and the USA. As of January 2022, a total of 31,151 people had claimed citizenship since the passing of the 2008 law, of which more than 11,000 were Brazilian nationals. The final deadline to reclaim citizenship for some qualifying individuals was moved to December 31, 2022, because of the COVID-19 pandemic.

This has in part contributed to a considerable increase in the number of people eligible to vote in legislative elections, with 23,992 new voters counted between the 2018 and 2023 elections. In light of this evolution, ahead of the 2023 election, representatives of most major parties, such as Piraten deputy Sven Clement and déi Gréng deputy Djuna Bernard travelled to Florianopolis, Brazil to co-organize an election information event, an action which some, such as déi Lénk deputy Nathalie Oberweis, criticized as unnecessary and overly expensive. Ultimately, only 188 of the 19,000 eligible voters registered to vote, by post, in the election.

== Loss of nationality ==
A Luxembourg citizen aged 18 or over may renounce their citizenship at any time, free of charge, provided that doing so would not render them stateless.

A Luxembourg citizen who became such by naturalization, option, or recovery may be stripped of their citizenship if it emerges that they obtained it by making false statements or through a marriage of convenience, provided that such an action would not render them stateless.

== Multiple citizenship ==
Since 1 January 2009, Luxembourg has allowed multiple citizenship. Since then, many Belgians have made use of the new law to adopt Belgian-Luxembourg citizenship, especially Belgians living in Arelerland, a part of the Belgian province of Luxembourg at the border with the Grand Duchy.

== Citizenship of the European Union ==
Because Luxembourg forms part of the European Union, Luxembourg citizens are also citizens of the European Union under European Union law and thus enjoy rights of free movement and have the right to vote in elections for the European Parliament. When in a non-EU country where there is no Luxembourg embassy, Luxembourg citizens have the right to get consular protection from the embassy of any other EU country present in that country. Luxembourgish citizens can live and work in any country within the EU as a result of the right of free movement and residence granted in Article 21 of the EU Treaty.

== Travel freedom of Luxembourg citizens ==
Visa requirements for Luxembourgish citizens

Visa requirements for Luxembourg citizens are administrative entry restrictions by the authorities of other states placed on citizens of Luxembourg. In 2015, Luxembourg citizens had visa-free or visa-on-arrival access to 171 countries and territories, ranking the Luxembourg passport 3rd in the world according to the Visa Restrictions Index.

In 2017, Luxembourg nationality is ranked sixteenth in Nationality Index (QNI). This index differs from the Visa Restrictions Index, which focuses on external factors including travel freedom. The QNI considers, in addition, to travel freedom on internal factors such as peace & stability, economic strength, and human development as well.

== See also ==
- Luxembourgish passport
