= East German passport =

Passport issued to citizens of East Germany

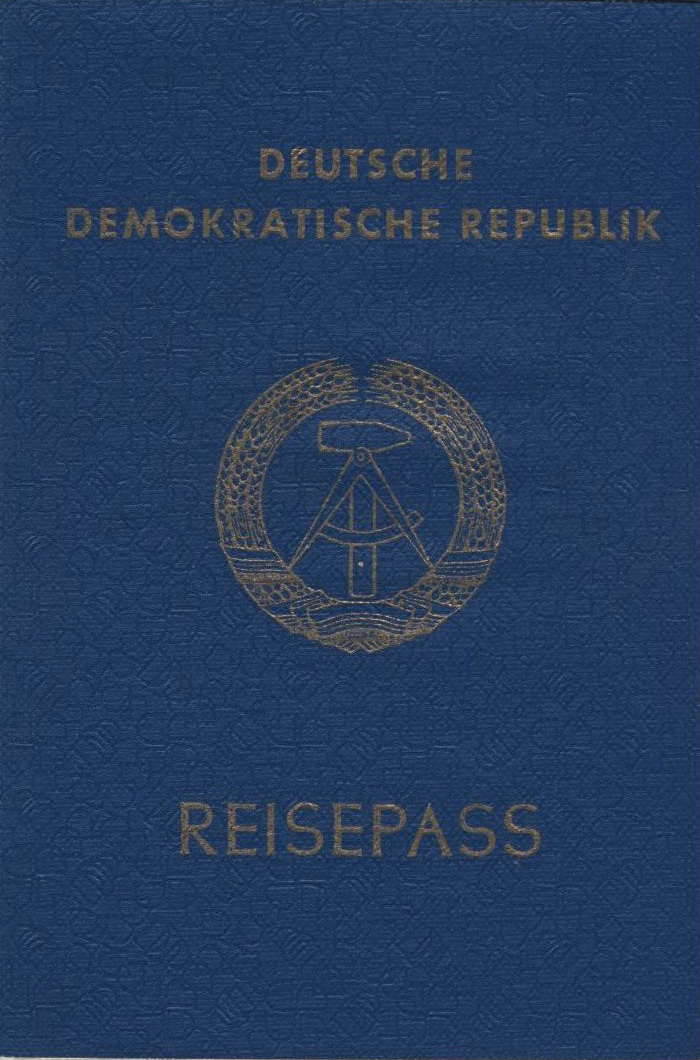
- East German passport
- Type: Passport
- Issued by: East Germany
- Purpose: Identification
- Eligibility: East German citizenship

The East German passport was issued to citizens of the former German Democratic Republic (commonly known as East Germany) for international travel. Since the reunification of Germany in October 1990, all once-citizens of the former East have been issued all-German passports.

== Overview ==
According to a Washington Post report in 1989, only 25% of East Germans were passport holders. This is a comparable statistic to the proportion of U.S. citizens in possession of a passport in 2007.

According to an East German passport law in 1957, East German citizens needed an exit visa from the GDR to travel abroad, including West Germany and West Berlin. The penalty for making an unauthorized journey outside East Germany was imprisonment.

Once they returned from their travels, the passports needed to be turned in.

== Types of passports ==
There were at least four types of passports: alien, service, standard, and diplomatic.

While standard passports were blue in color, alien and service passports were in different shades of green. Diplomatic passports were in red.

== Languages ==
East German passports contained text in German, French, English, and Russian. English, however, was omitted from the passport after a revision in or around 1988.

== Passport note ==
East German passports contained a note to the effect that:

The Ministry of Foreign Affairs asks all authorities both inland and abroad to let the bearer of this passport travel freely and to grant him any protection and assistance that he might require.

Versions issued in late 1989 forward to the country's demise in October 1990 omit the note.

== Following reunification ==
Following reunification in October 1990, the Unification Treaty provided that East German passports would remain in force until, at the latest, 31 December 1995. After that date, East German passports were invalid for identification and citizens had to use German passports.
